= Upper Derwent Valley =

Area of the Peak District National Park in England

Coordinates: 53°16′28″N 1°38′08″W

The Upper Derwent Valley is an area of the Peak District National Park in England. It largely lies in Derbyshire, but its north eastern area lies in Sheffield, South Yorkshire. Its most significant features are the Derwent Dams, Ladybower, Derwent and Howden, which form Ladybower Reservoir, Derwent Reservoir and Howden Reservoir respectively.

== History ==
In 1899, the Derwent Valley Water Board was set up to supply water to Derby, Leicester, Nottingham and Sheffield, and the two Gothic-style dams were built across the River Derwent to create Howden Reservoir (1912) and Derwent Reservoir (1916).

West of the Derwent a large village known as Birchinlee, locally known as 'Tin Town', was created for the 'navvies'—the workers who built the dams—and their families, many of whom came from the Elan Valley Reservoirs in Wales. One of the buildings was salvaged and rebuilt at Hope where in 2014 it was reported to be housing a beauty parlour.

The villages in the Upper Derwent Valley:

- Bamford
- Yorkshire Bridge
- Hathersage
- Grindleford
- Calver

A standard-gauge railway, for transporting materials, connected the Water Board offices in Bamford with the work site. A section of the track of the railway is now a footpath; other sections are visible when water levels in the reservoirs are low. The railway engine house no longer exists at the old offices. The offices are now occupied by a Quaker group.

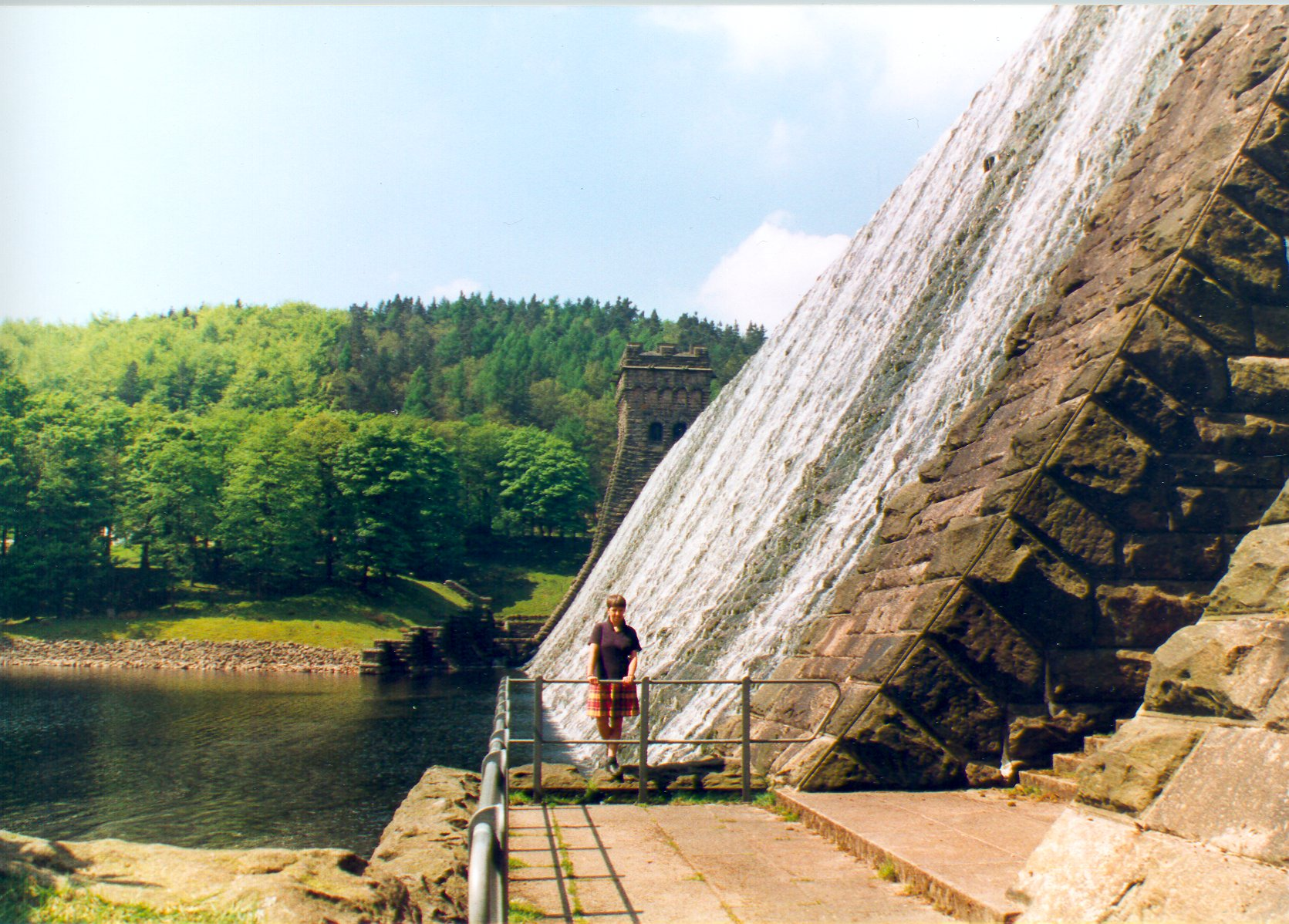
Derwent Dam

Over the decades, demand for water increased. Piped intakes were constructed from the rivers Ashop and Alport to the west to feed directly into the Derwent reservoir, but soon demand increased further to the point where another reservoir was required. The larger Ladybower Reservoir, built largely during World War II, necessitated the flooding of the villages of Derwent and Ashopton, with the occupants being relocated to the Yorkshire Bridge estate, just downstream of Ladybower dam. A packhorse bridge with a preservation order on it also had to be moved, and was rebuilt at Slippery Stones, north of Howden Reservoir. The bodies in the churchyard were exhumed and reburied at Bamford. The reservoir was completed in 1945.

The topographical similarity between the Upper Derwent Valley and the Ruhr Valley of Germany led to the dams being used as a practice environment for the Lancaster bombers of 617 Squadron (Dam Busters) in 1943 before their attack on the Ruhr dams. The Dam Busters film was subsequently filmed at the Derwent Dams, and the area sees occasional commemorative flypasts by the Battle of Britain Memorial Flight.

The reservoirs cover 198.50 square kilometres, and can hold 463,692 million litres. The main beneficiary of the reservoirs' water is Sheffield, less than 15 kilometres (9.3 mi) away, but the reservoirs are also connected to the Severn Trent's water grid that extends to mid-Wales and Gloucestershire. The reservoirs were originally intended to supply water to the cities of Sheffield, Derby, Leicester and Nottingham. Sheffield was supplied with "raw" water for treatment in its own treatment plants. The other cities were supplied with treated water. Water was treated at the Yorkshire Bridge works (now converted to apartments), and at the much bigger Bamford Filter works, much expanded in the 1960s.

The area is good for rare birds, including black grouse and goshawk. Much of the surrounding land is administered by the National Trust and is popular as a recreational area for walking and cycling.

== Incidents ==
On 9 May 2016, a large moor fire was accidentally caused by a disposable barbecue on the moors above Ladybower Reservoir. The fire required the attendance of twelve fire engines from eight stations, Edale Mountain Rescue, and Peak Park and National Trust officials. Because of an incident involving a vehicle and a member of the emergency services, a Coastguard SAR helicopter and Yorkshire Air Ambulance were also required on the scene. The injured person was airlifted to the Northern General Hospital in Sheffield. During the incident all access roads to the reservoir were closed, though the A57 Snake Pass was unaffected.
