= Birchinlee =

Coordinates: 53.420°N 1.751°W

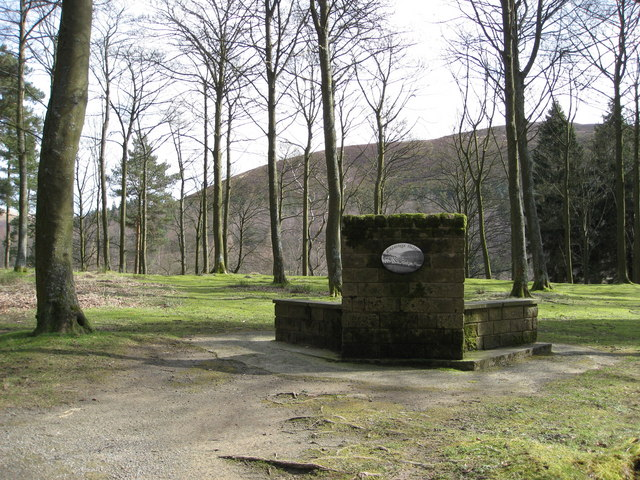
- Birchinlee was a temporary hamlet in the Upper Derwent Valley in Derbyshire, England, on the western shore of Derwent Reservoir.

- Location within Derbyshire
- Population: 0
- OS grid reference: SK165915
- District: High Peak
- Shire county: Derbyshire
- Region: East Midlands
- Country: England
- Sovereign state: United Kingdom
- Post town: HOPE VALLEY
- Postcode district: S33
- Police: Derbyshire
- Fire: Derbyshire
- Ambulance: East Midlands
- UK Parliament: High Peak

Birchinlee is the site of "Tin Town", a village built by the Derwent Valley Water Board for the workers (and their families) who constructed the Derwent and Howden Dams between 1902 and 1916. Most of the workers had previously been engaged in the construction, in Wales, of the Elan Valley Reservoirs where the accommodation was very basic. At Birchinlee, a "model village" was built; its infrastructure included hospitals, school, canteen (pub), post office, shops, recreation hall, public bath house, police station, railway station, rubbish dump with incinerator, and much else. One of the shops was a well-stocked store owned by the Gregory brothers from Tideswell. Accommodation consisted of workmen's huts, foremen's huts and married workmen's huts. The latter were decorated to a high standard, as photographs from the period confirm. The population rose to 900 people.

Remnants of "Tin Town" can still be seen when walking to the west of Derwent Reservoir. The former railway track is now a footpath. One of the buildings was salvaged and rebuilt at Hope where in 2014 it was reported to be housing a beauty parlour.

A number of books and resources charting the history of Birchinlee and the dambuilders have been written by Professor Brian Robinson (whose mother was born and lived in Tintown) and Doctor Bill Beven, Peak District National Park archaeologist.

The Derwent Valley Museum, formerly located on the Derwent Reservoir dam and run privately by the late Vic Hallam, told the history of the Derwent valley and of Derwent, Ashopton and Birchinlee as well as the tale of RAF Squadron 617 and its training for Operation Chastise (the "Dam Busters" raids) during the Second World War.

Further up the valley is Beavers Croft, a 14th-century housestead that was occupied by the chief engineer of Howden Dam in the early part of the 20th century. It is currently owned by private business partners that let the house for self-catering holidays during the summer, and the barn was occupied by a part-time PDNPA ranger until late 2013.

== See also ==
- Upper Derwent Valley
