= Alport Castles =

Landslip feature in Derbyshire, England

- Landslide
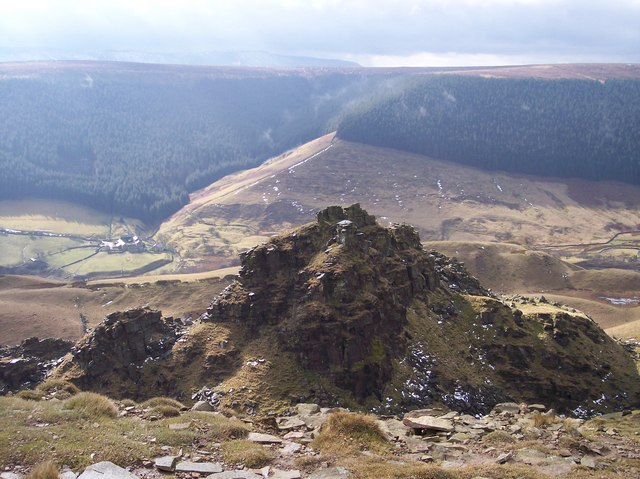
- One of the outcrops known as "The Tower"

- Location within Derbyshire
- Coordinates: 53.4209°N 1.7884°W
- Location: Derbyshire, England, UK

The Alport Castles are a landslip feature in the Peak District National Park in Derbyshire. At over half a mile long, it is thought to be the largest landslide in the United Kingdom. The name "castles" comes from the debris from the landslide, which has produced several gritstone mounds that tower over the valley and appear from the distance to look like castles. Viewed from a distance the largest of these, the "Tower", resembles a full-scale motte and bailey castle.

The Alport Castles are on the eastern side of the River Alport valley, part of the National Trust's High Peak Estate; they lie north of the Snake Pass and north-west of Ladybower Reservoir.

Below the crags, Alport Castles Farm stands on the River Alport. Suffragette Hannah Mitchell was born at the remote farm in 1871 and grew up there.

== Geology ==
About 300 million years ago, the area now known as the Peak District was part of a river delta that flowed into the sea. The deposits were sorted such that the finest material travelled the furthest and was deposited in the deep ocean as black shales. Further deposits accumulated on the slopes of the oceans and collapsed, resulting in turbidite deposits. Further turbidite flows eroded into previous ones, resulting in the type of deposit seen at Alport Castle. As the delta prograded (the mouth of the river moved further out to sea), the deposits become coarser. In the Peak District this coarse material is the gritstone that caps high points, protecting them from erosion.

The exact cause of the landslide is still debated. One theory is that the soft shales below are too weak to support the weight of the heavy sandstone above and collapse under it, or that, because water can run through gritstone but not shale rock, trapped water may have "lubricated" the rock to the point where one layer slid over another, causing the landslide. A further possibility is that a valley glacier steepened the sides of the valley, leaving unstable slopes that failed after the glacier melted, causing the landslide. However, immediately upstream is a normal river valley so any glacier would have been small.

Alport Castles has been selected for geological conservation as one of the most significant landslips in Britain. The rock faces and cliffs are unstable and unsuitable for climbing and scrambling. The site is popular with walkers.

== Fauna ==
The crags are used for nesting by ravens and peregrine falcons.

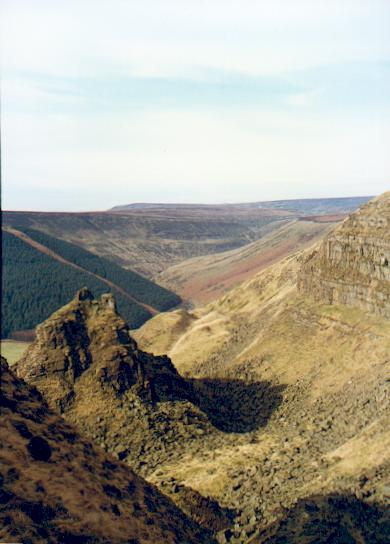
One of the outcrops known as "The Tower"

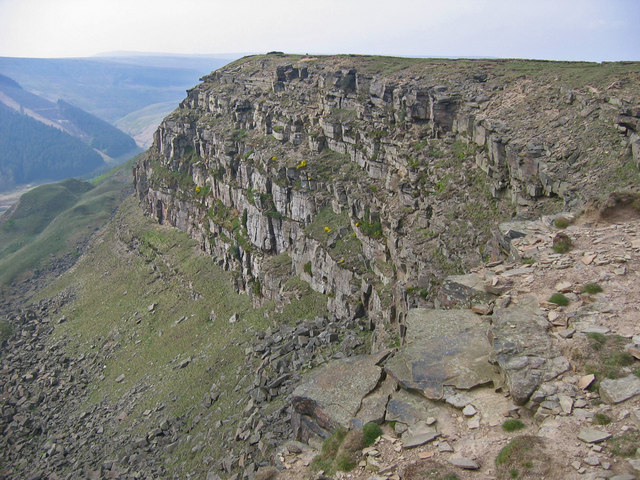
Layers of rock exposed by the landslide

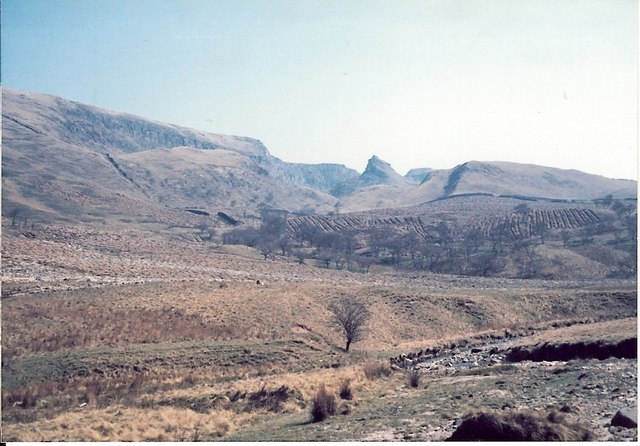
Image from 1974
