= Derwent Woodlands War Memorial =

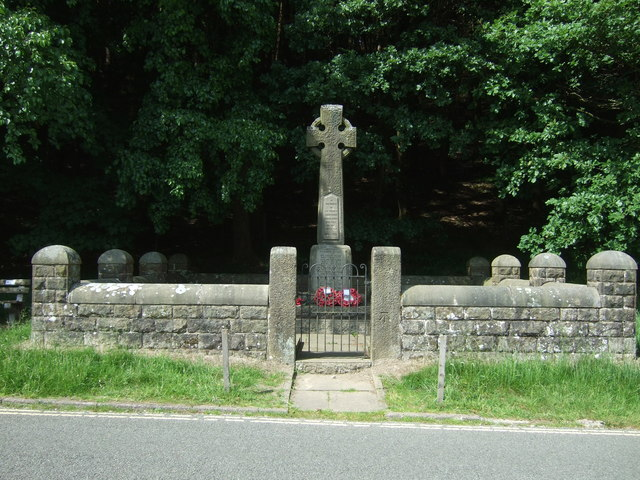
- Derwent Woodlands War Memorial

- Location in Derbyshire
- 53°23′29″N 1°43′37″W
- Location: Derwent, Derbyshire, England

Listed Building – Grade II
- Official name: War Memorial
- Designated: 6 November 2019
- Reference no.: 1464236

Derwent Woodlands War Memorial is a 20th-century grade II listed war memorial near the Ladybower Reservoir, Derbyshire.

== History ==
The war memorial was unveiled in the early 1920s. It features the names of local residents of the now submerged village of Derwent who died during the First World War.

The memorial has been Grade II listed since 6 November 2019.

== See also ==
- Listed buildings in Derwent
