= Severn Trent =

English water company

Severn Trent plc
- Type: Public limited company (plc)
- Traded as: LSE: SVT; FTSE 100 Component
- Industry: Water industry
- Founded: 1989; 37 years ago
- Headquarters: Coventry, England, UK
- Area served: Midlands, South West, Wales
- Key people: Christine Hodgson (Chairperson); James Jesic (CEO)
- Products: Drinking water; Recycled wastewater
- Production output: 1.8 Gl/day (drinking); 1.4 Gl/day (recycled)
- Revenue: ▲£2,831 million (2026)
- Operating income: ▲£861 million (2026)
- Net income: ▲£371 million (2026)
- Subsidiaries: Hafren Dyfrdwy
- Website: www.severntrent.com

Severn Trent plc is a water company based in Coventry, England. It supplies 4.6 million households and business across the Midlands, South West, and Wales.

It is traded on the London Stock Exchange and a constituent of the FTSE 100 Index. Severn Trent, the trading name owned by the company, applies to a group of companies operating across the United Kingdom, United States and mainland Europe, with some involvement in the Middle East. It took its name from the two predecessor river authorities, which managed the catchment of the Severn and the Trent.

== History ==
The Severn Trent Water Authority was established in 1974. In July 1989, the Severn Trent Water Authority was partially privatised under the Water Act 1989, together with the rest of the water supply and sewage disposal industry in England and Wales, to form Severn Trent Water, with a responsibility to supply freshwater and treat sewage for around 8 million people living in the English Midlands, and also small areas of Wales and the South West.

The company has made several acquisitions over its history. It acquired Biffa in 1991, but demerged the waste management business 15 years later, and Biffa was subsequently listed separately on the London Stock Exchange. In 1993, it acquired the East Worcestershire Waterworks Company, a former statutory water company whose area was surrounded by Severn Trent's existing water supply area, and their operations were merged. In 2017, it acquired Dee Valley Water, a water-only company with an area adjoining Severn Trent's own. In 2018, the areas of the two operating companies were adjusted so that Hafren Dyfrdwy (the new name for the Dee Valley company) took on all Severn Trent Water's water supply and wastewater operations in Wales, and the small area of the former Dee Valley operation within England (an exclave at Chester) became part of Severn Trent Water.

In 2010, the company moved its headquarters from Birmingham to a custom built office complex in the centre of Coventry.

In June 2016, Severn Trent Water and United Utilities formed Water Plus in preparation for the water market deregulation, to provide the retail services for their non household customers, after being granted approval by the Competition and Markets Authority.

Severn Trent made history in 2023 when it became the first FTSE 100 group to have an all-female top team following the appointment of Helen Miles as chief financial officer, joining Garfield as chief executive and Hodgson as chair. Garfield stepped down from Severn Trent at the end of 2025 after an 11-year tenure in which she became the longest-serving female FTSE 100 chief executive. She was replaced by James Jesic.

== Operations ==
The main companies in the group are Severn Trent Water, Hafren Dyfrdwy and Severn Trent Services. As with all water companies in the United Kingdom, Severn Trent is regulated under the Water Industry Act 1991.

Severn Trent Laboratories was rebranded as part of Severn Trent Services in 2010, to streamline the company and give it a single worldwide image, rather than a series of separate organisations with different identities. In January 2007, the American side of Severn Trent Laboratories was sold to HIG Capital.

Severn Trent assisted wildlife regeneration projects in Shropshire, Derbyshire, Nottinghamshire, and the Peak District, under various named projects, including "Great Big Nature Boost", launched in April 2020. It helped fund the Mease River restoration project which won the UK River Prize in April 2026, after 17km of the river was restored and 25 hectares of new habitat created.

As of 2021, the company supplies about 4.6 million households and businesses in its area, rising from 3.7 million in 2008. Severn Trent Water has a call centre in Coventry, dealing with operational emergencies and billing enquiries, and two other call centres in Derby and Shrewsbury, which deal solely with billing enquiries. Its head office is the new custom built Severn Trent Centre in Coventry.

Severn Trent was the only company to achieve 4 star status in the Environment Agency's annual Environmental Protection Assessment for 2024 – with confirmation of its sixth consecutive year of four-star EPA status, twice as long as any other British water company. Severn Trent has used thermal-imaging drones since 2017 to detect leaking pipes and conduct treatment facility and reservoir surveys, for scaffolding and manpower cost efficiencies. In November 2024, the drone team completed trials of remotely-controlled unmanned aerial vehicles (UAVs) equipped with thermal imaging capabilities, ahead of an expected Civial Aviation Authority (CAA) legislative change permitting drone use beyond “line of sight” (approx 1000 ft).

Severn Trent became a member of the UK government's Youth Guarantee scheme, pledging in May 2026 to offer 400 opportunities for young people, including a mixture of traditional apprenticeships, six-month-long paid work placements and further training places, between 2026 and 2029. Every year the company also offers 500 work experience to young people at school and 100 new apprenticeship opportunities, training at the purpose-built Academy in Coventry.

== Regulation and criticism ==
In 2004, a water industry contractor, M Holleran Ltd., complained that Severn Trent had failed to follow the Utilities Contract Regulations 1996 correctly when appointing contractors for its maintenance programme for reservoirs, water distribution infrastructure and sewerage systems. Holleran had been left off a list of potential contractors used by Severn Trent because its annual turnover was lower than the level considered suitable by Severn Trent. Smaller companies were permitted to form joint ventures so as to aggregate their turnover but Holleran argued that the timescale allowed for such arrangements to be made was inadequate. When the issue went to court it was held that Holleran had failed to act "promptly and in any event within three months from the date when grounds for the proceedings first arose", and therefore their case was rejected.

In July 2007, the Mythe Water Treatment Works near Tewkesbury became inundated with water from the River Severn during the Summer 2007 United Kingdom floods. The water coming into the plant was contaminated, and this led to the loss of all running water for approximately 150,000 people in Cheltenham, Gloucester and Tewkesbury.

In July 2008, OFWAT fined Severn Trent Water £35.8 million for deliberately providing false information to Ofwat and for delivering poor service to its customers. In July 2008, the company was fined £2m (reduced from a previous judgement of £4m) for poor information reporting and covering up misleading leakage data.

Despite improvements, according to Ofwat, the percentage of leakages from 2010 to 2011 was the highest in England and Wales, at 27%, representing 0.5 billion litres (500,000 tonnes) per day.

| Year | 2014-15 | 2015-16 | 2016-17 | 2017-18 | 2018-19 | 2019-20 | 2020-21 |
|---|---|---|---|---|---|---|---|
| Volume (million litres per day) | 440 | 429 | 424 | 446 | 417.8 | 398.8 | 410.2 |

On 11 March 2016, Severn Trent customers in Derbyshire were issued a "do not use" notice due to high levels of chlorine detected in the water supply, leaving thousands of households without a clean, reliable water supply.

Severn Trent is one of several companies that have faced criticism and regulatory action for their role in the national issue of sewage discharge into rivers. In 2024, it was fined over £2 million for discharging more than 260 million litres of raw sewage into the River Trent from its Strongford Treatment Works. The discharges occurred between November 2019 and February 2020 but avoided catastrophic pollution due to high river flows from storms. In May 2026, Severn Trent announced a 41% year-on-year reduction in average spills from storm overflows.

In December 2024, Severn Trent Water was accused by the BBC's Panorama of an accounting trick artificially inflating its balance sheet by more than a billion pounds. An investment ('Severn Trent Trimpley') that the company claims is worth £1.68 billion in its accounts, was said to have no value to the overall business in reality, but made the company appear more financially robust, supporting payments to shareholders. Severn Trent denied the accusation, saying Panorama's allegations were "completely inaccurate".

In March 2025, Severn Trent Water faced backlash for dismissing a sewage worker after they posted on the company intranet condemning Hamas as "a group of violent and disgusting terrorists" on the anniversary of the October 7 attacks. The disciplinary action followed internal complaints that their language was derogatory and reflected poorly on the company's commitment to diversity and inclusion.

== Reservoirs ==
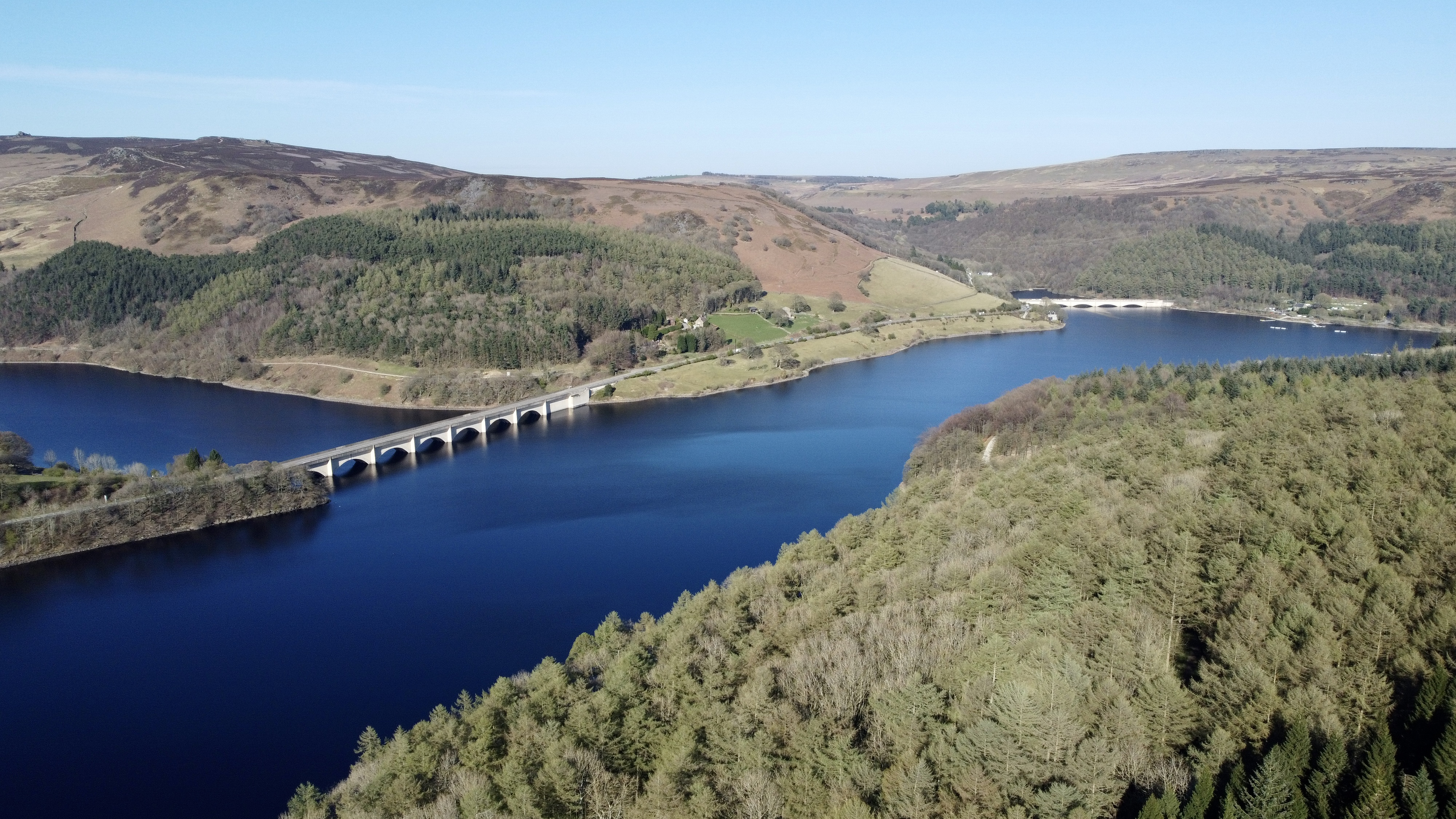
The Ladybower Reservoir in Derbyshire is one of three Severn Trent reservoirs in the Upper Derwent Valley

The company operates a number of reservoirs, many of which are accessible for recreational use. These include:

- Carsington Reservoir – River Derwent compensation flow pumped storage facility
- Upper Derwent Valley (Derwent, Howden and Ladybower Reservoirs) – Built by the Derwent Valley Water Board to supply the cities of Sheffield, Derby, Nottingham and Leicester
- Bartley Reservoir
- Draycote Water
- Foremark Reservoir
- Shustoke Reservoir
- Tittesworth reservoir
- Ogston Reservoir
- Linacre Reservoirs (non operational since 1995)
- Barby Storage Reservoir
- Trimpley Reservoir
- Severn Trent Water also runs the filtration works at the Elan Valley Reservoirs
