= Derwent, Derbyshire =

Former village in Derbyshire, England

Coordinates: 53.38°N 1.72°W

Derwent
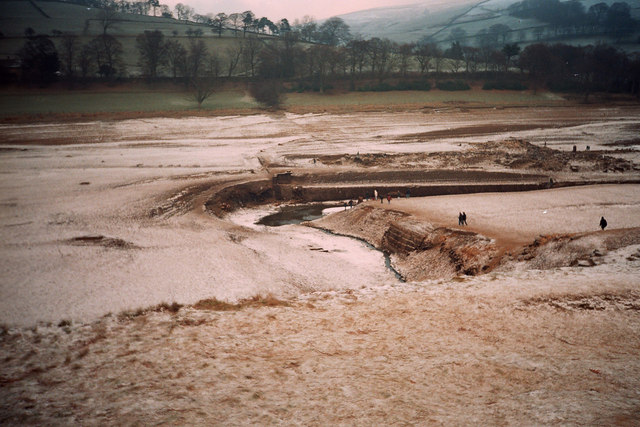
- Remains of the village exposed in 1995

- Location within Derbyshire
- Population: 51 (2001)
- District: High Peak
- Shire county: Derbyshire
- Region: East Midlands
- Country: England
- Sovereign state: United Kingdom
- Post town: HOPE VALLEY
- Postcode district: S33
- Dialling code: 01433
- Police: Derbyshire
- Fire: Derbyshire
- Ambulance: East Midlands
- UK Parliament: High Peak

Derwent was a village 'drowned' in 1944 when the Ladybower Reservoir in Derbyshire, England, was created. The village of Ashopton, Derwent Woodlands church, and Derwent Hall were also 'drowned' in the construction of the reservoir.

== Demolition ==
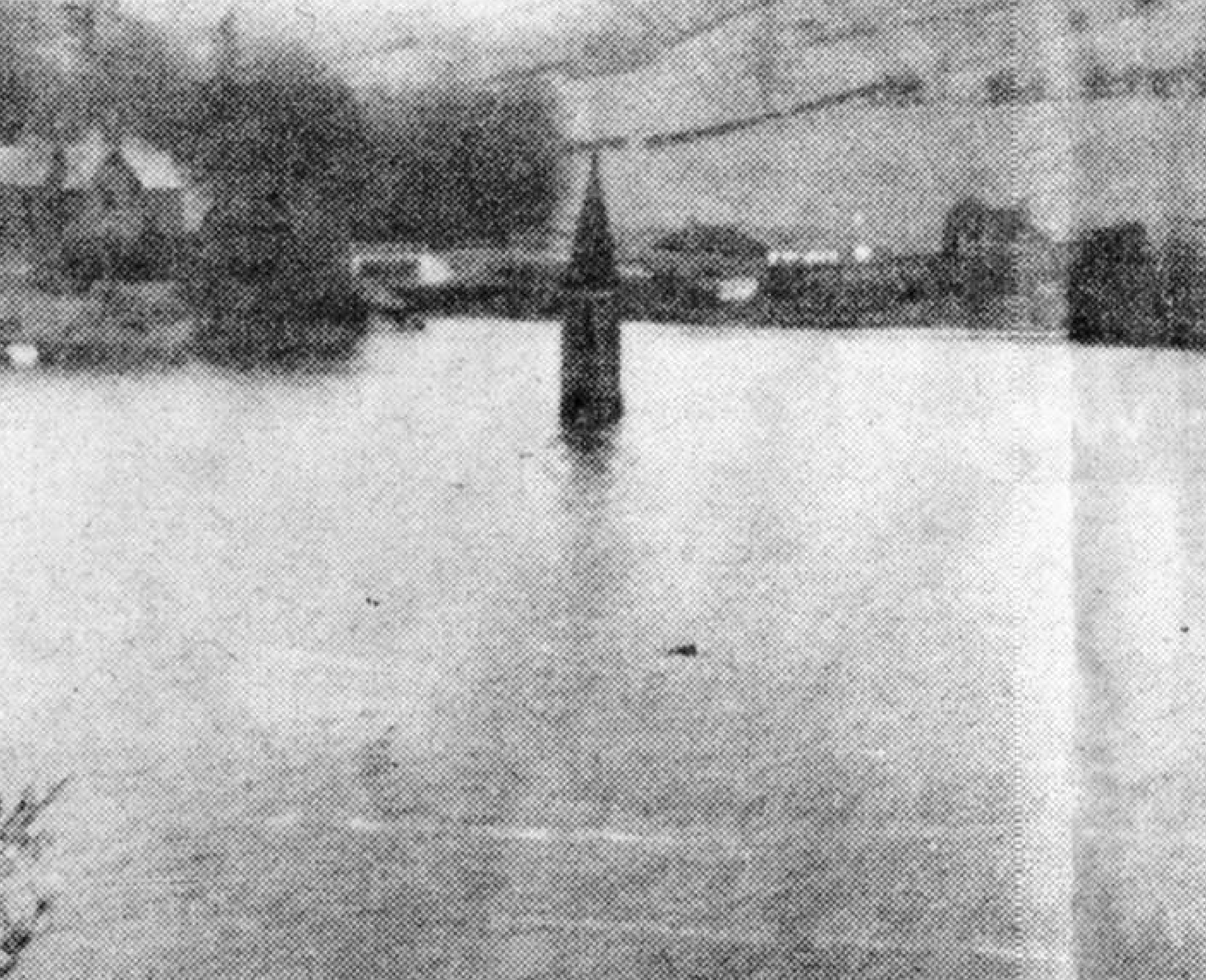
The church tower of Derwent slowly disappearing below the water as the reservoir was filled in 1946

All buildings in the village had been demolished by autumn 1943, and the impounded waters of the reservoir began to rise by the end of 1944.

A 17th-century packhorse bridge in the village had a preservation order which prevented it from being demolished. In order to comply with this, the bridge was transported from the original location near Derwent Hall and reconstructed at the head of Howden Reservoir at Slippery Stones. It is now part of the footpaths and cycle tracks that run along the reservoirs. The bridge is a scheduled monument, and it is one of the very few structures from Derwent village to have completely survived the reservoir's construction and still be visible.

The church held its last service on 17 March 1943. The bell from the church was re-hung in St Philip's Church in Chaddesden, built in 1955. The stained glass from the east window of the church, designed by Charles Eamer Kempe, was saved and installed into the east window of St Michael and All Angels' Church, Hathersage. Bodies from the graveyard at Derwent had been exhumed in 1940 and were reburied in the village of Bamford. The church spire was left intact to form a memorial to Derwent. However, it was dynamited on 15 December 1947, on the rationale of safety concerns.

== Remains ==
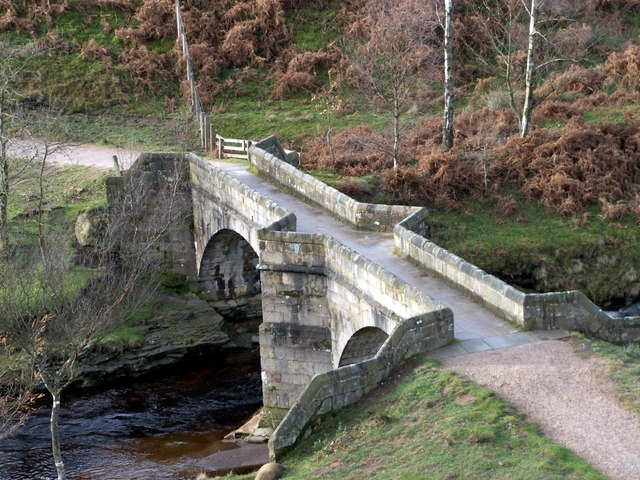
A packhorse bridge is one of the very few parts of Derwent that survived, having been moved to Slippery Stones.

The site of the village has been revealed when the reservoir levels fell dramatically in 1976, 1989, 1995, 2003, 2018, 2022 and 2025.

In 2018, the appearance of the village due to low water levels caused unprecedented crowds to visit the rarely visible site. On 3 November 2018, a man had to be rescued by a mountain rescue team after getting stuck in extremely thick mud around the ruins of the village. On 17 November 2018 it was reported that the site had been vandalised by some of those visiting, with park rangers forced to stop visitors removing items from the site and with graffiti scrawled on some buildings.

Although nearly the whole village was flooded, a few houses survive above the waterline. One source notes that five houses from the old village remain, as well as the village hall and several farms. There remains a civil parish of Derwent. At the time of the 2001 UK census, it had a population of 51. At the 2011 Census, the population remained less than 100. Details were included in the civil parish of Aston, Derbyshire.

The most significant surviving reminder of Derwent Village is the village's packhorse bridge, painted in 1925 by the artist Stanley Royle. The bridge was transported and rebuilt at the head of Howden Reservoir at Slippery Stones where it now forms part of the paths and cycle tracks around the Derwent Valley reservoirs. The Derwent Valley Museum, formerly located on the Derwent Reservoir dam and run privately by the late Vic Hallam, told the history of the Derwent valley and of Derwent and Ashopton as well as the tale of RAF Squadron 617 ("The Dam Busters") and its training for Operation Chastise during the Second World War.

There is no formal memorial to any of the villages. However, the site of the temporary village at Birchinlee, built to house the construction workers for the higher Derwent and Howden Reservoirs, is marked by a plaque. The only marker of the location of Derwent is the village's War Memorial, which stands above Ladybower Reservoir at a point to the west of the village.

== Notable residents ==
- Charles Balguy was born at Derwent Hall in 1707.

== See also ==
- Listed buildings in Derwent, Derbyshire
- List of places in Derbyshire
- Capel Celyn (similar village 'drowned' to create a reservoir)
- Derwent Woodlands War Memorial
- West End, Yorkshire (similar village 'drowned' to create a reservoir)
