= Charles Balguy =

English physician and translator

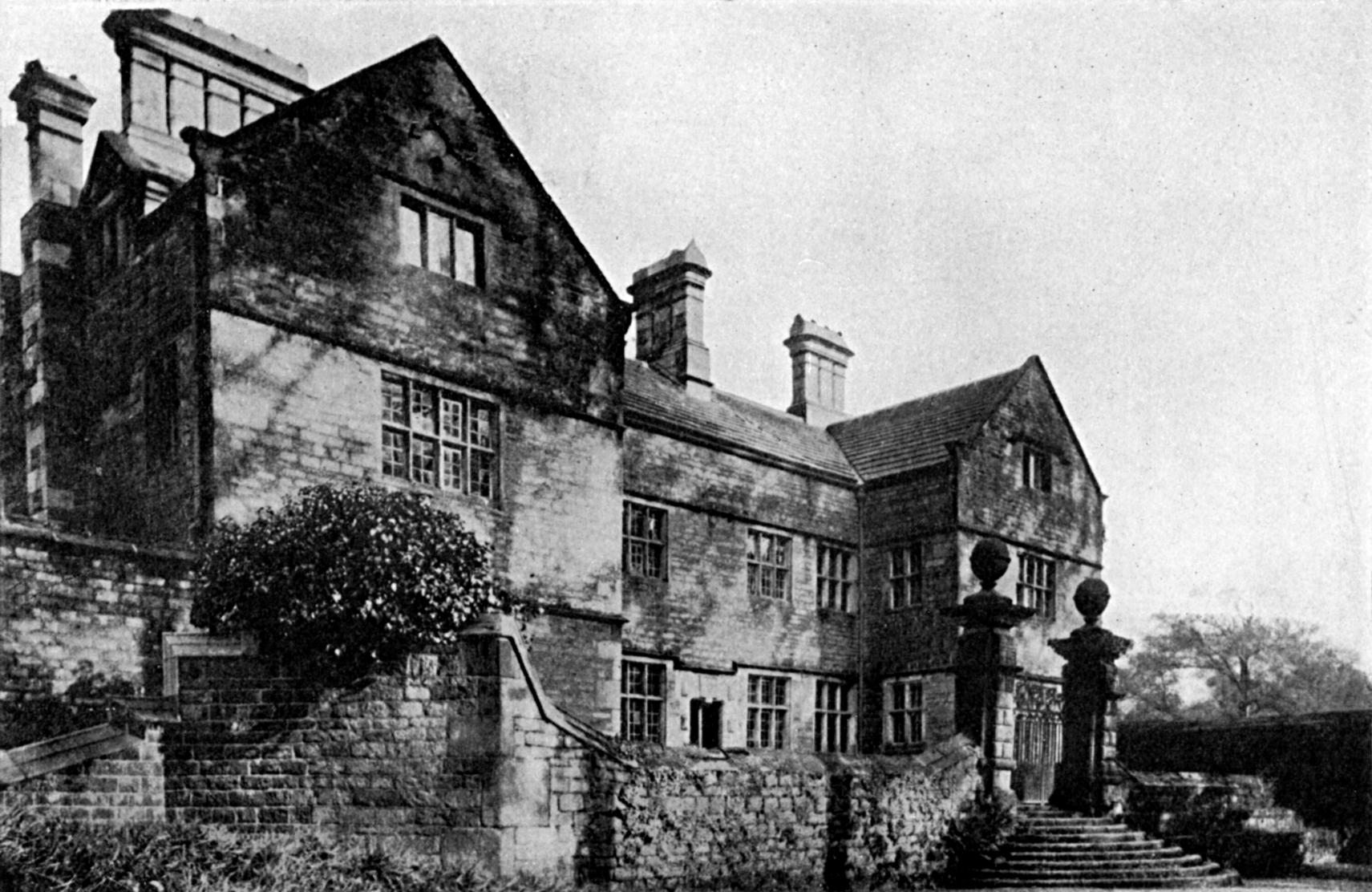
- Charles' birthplace – now under Ladybower Reservoir
- Born: 1708; Derwent, Derbyshire, England
- Died: 1767; Peterborough, England
- Education: Chesterfield Grammar School and St. John's College, Cambridge
- Occupation: Physician
- Parent: Henry Balguy

Dr. Charles Balguy (1708 – 28 February 1767) was an English physician and translator.

Balguy was born at Derwent Hall, Derbyshire, and was educated at Chesterfield Grammar School and St. John's College, Cambridge, where he took the degree of M.B. in 1731, and M.D. in 1750. He practised at Peterborough, and was secretary of the literary club there. He contributed to the Philosophical Transactions, and in 1741 he published, anonymously, a translation of Giovanni Boccaccio's Decameron. This was the best translation in English at the time and was reprinted several times. He wrote some medical essays, and particularly a treatise

- De Morbo Miliari (Lond. 1758)
- The Decameron, Or, Ten Days' Entertainment, of Boccaccio By Giovanni Boccaccio, Charles Balguy
- An Account of the Dead Bodies of a Man and Woman, Which Were Preserved 49 Years in the Moors in Derbyshire;

He died at Peterborough and was buried in the chancel of St John's Church, where there is a marble monument to his memory, describing him as "a man of various and great learning". The statement that he translated the Decameron is recorded by his school friend, Dr Samuel Pegge, in the College of Arms, who expressly mentions the fact.
