= Derwent Valley Water Board =

Derwent Valley Water Act 1899
- Act of Parliament
- Parliament of the United Kingdom
- Long title: An Act to authorise the construction of works for impounding and distributing the waters of the Rivers Derwent and Ashop and their tributaries and to constitute a joint board representative of the Corporations of Derby Leicester Nottingham and Sheffield and of the County Council of Derbyshire for the purposes of such construction and to confer further powers in relation to the supply of water on the said Corporations and County Council and for other purposes.
- Citation: 62 & 63 Vict. c. cclxix
- Territorial extent: United Kingdom

Dates
- Royal assent: 9 August 1899
- Commencement: 9 August 1899 (Note: The Acts of Parliament (Commencement) Act 1793.)

Other legislation
- Amended by: Statute Law (Repeals) Act 1989; Statute Law (Repeals) Act 1995

Status: Amended

Derwent Valley Water Act 1901
- Act of Parliament
- Parliament of the United Kingdom
- Long title: An Act to confer further powers on the Derwent Valley Water Board with respect to their water undertaking and for other purposes.
- Citation: 1 Edw. 7. c. lxxx
- Territorial extent: United Kingdom

Dates
- Royal assent: 26 July 1901
- Commencement: 26 July 1901

Other legislation
- Amended by: Statute Law (Repeals) Act 1989; Statute Law (Repeals) Act 1995

Status: Amended

Derwent Valley Water Act 1904 (Note: Section 1.)
- Act of Parliament
- Parliament of the United Kingdom
- Long title: An Act to confer further powers on the Derwent Valley Water Board to confer powers upon the Corporation of Leicester with respect to the Works authorised to be constructed by that Corporation under the powers of the Derwent Valley Water Act 1899 to confer borrowing powers upon the Corporations of Derby Leicester Sheffield and Nottingham and for other purposes.
- Citation: 4 Edw. 7. c. cxcvi
- Territorial extent: United Kingdom

Dates
- Royal assent: 15 August 1904
- Commencement: 15 August 1904

Other legislation
- Amended by: Statute Law (Repeals) Act 1989; Statute Law (Repeals) Act 1995

Status: Amended

Text of statute as originally enacted

Derwent Valley Water Act 1909
- Act of Parliament
- Parliament of the United Kingdom
- Long title: An Act to confer further powers upon the Derwent Valley Water Board to confer powers upon the Leicester Corporation and the Sheffield Corporation and for other purposes.
- Citation: 9 Edw. 7. c. lxiii
- Territorial extent: United Kingdom

Dates
- Royal assent: 16 August 1909
- Commencement: 16 August 1909

Other legislation
- Amended by: Statute Law (Repeals) Act 1989; Statute Law (Repeals) Act 1995

Status: Partially repealed

Derwent Valley Water Act 1912
- Act of Parliament
- Parliament of the United Kingdom
- Long title: An Act to extend the time limited by the Derwent Valley Water Act 1909 for the compulsory purchase of lands to make provisions as to compensation water gauges and for other purposes.
- Citation: 2 & 3 Geo. 5. c. xxxviii
- Territorial extent: United Kingdom

Dates
- Royal assent: 7 August 1912
- Commencement: 7 August 1912

Other legislation
- Amended by: Statute Law (Repeals) Act 1995

Status: Partially repealed

Text of statute as originally enacted

Derwent Valley Water Act 1920
- Act of Parliament
- Parliament of the United Kingdom
- Long title: An Act to confer further powers on the Derwent Valley Water Board, and for other purposes.
- Citation: 10 & 11 Geo. 5. c. clxv
- Territorial extent: United Kingdom

Dates
- Royal assent: 3 December 1920
- Commencement: 3 December 1920

Other legislation
- Amended by: Statute Law (Repeals) Act 1995

Status: Amended

Derwent Valley Water Act 1927
- Act of Parliament
- Parliament of the United Kingdom
- Long title: An Act to confer further powers on the Derwent Valley Water Board and for other purposes.
- Citation: 17 & 18 Geo. 5. c. lxx
- Territorial extent: United Kingdom

Dates
- Royal assent: 29 July 1927
- Commencement: 29 July 1927

Other legislation
- Amended by: Statute Law (Repeals) Act 1995

Status: Amended

Text of statute as originally enacted

Derwent Valley Water Act 1935
- Act of Parliament
- Parliament of the United Kingdom
- Long title: An Act to amend provisions of the Derwent Valley Water Acts 1899 to 1920 to provide for the abandonment of certain of the works authorised by those Acts to be constructed by the Leicester Corporation and to authorise that corporation to construct other works and for other purposes.
- Citation: 25 & 26 Geo. 5. c. cv
- Territorial extent: United Kingdom

Dates
- Royal assent: 2 August 1935
- Commencement: 2 August 1935

Other legislation
- Amended by: Statute Law (Repeals) Act 1995

Status: Amended

Text of statute as originally enacted

Derwent Valley Water Act 1938
- Act of Parliament
- Parliament of the United Kingdom
- Long title: An Act to confer further powers upon the Derwent Valley Water Board, and for other purposes.
- Citation: 1 & 2 Geo. 6. c. lxii
- Territorial extent: United Kingdom

Dates
- Royal assent: 13 July 1938
- Commencement: 13 July 1938

Other legislation
- Amended by: Statute Law (Repeals) Act 1995

Status: Amended

Derwent Valley Water Act 1944
- Act of Parliament
- Parliament of the United Kingdom
- Long title: An Act to authorise the Derwent Valley Water Board to construct new waterworks and to acquire lands to make provision for the protection of the gathering ground of the new waterworks to confer further powers upon the Board and for other purposes.
- Citation: 7 & 8 Geo. 6. c. xviii
- Territorial extent: United Kingdom

Dates
- Royal assent: 3 August 1944
- Commencement: 3 August 1944

Other legislation
- Amended by: Statute Law (Repeals) Act 1995

Status: Amended

Text of statute as originally enacted

The Derwent Valley Water Board was constituted by the Derwent Valley Water Act 1899 (62 & 63 Vict. c. cclxix) to supply the cities of Derby, Leicester, Nottingham and Sheffield, and the county of Derbyshire, with water impounded by a series of reservoirs along the upper reaches of the River Derwent in the Peak District of Derbyshire.

The board's works included the following reservoirs:

- Howden, built 1901-1912, capacity 1,980 million imperial gallons (9,000,000 m^{3}), formed by a masonry dam 117 feet (36 m) high and 1,080 feet (330 m) long.
- Derwent, built 1902-1916, capacity 2,120 million imperial gallons (9,600,000 m^{3}), formed by a masonry dam 114 feet (35 m) high and 1,110 feet (340 m) long.
- Ladybower, built 1935-1945, capacity 6,310 million imperial gallons (28,700,000 m^{3}), formed by an earth embankment 140 feet (43 m) high and 1,250 feet (380 m) long.

As part of the overall Derwent Valley water supply scheme there was additional supporting infrastructure including:

- River Ashop Abstraction and Ashop to Derwent Aqueduct
- River Noe Abstraction and Noe to Ladybower Aqueduct
- Bamford Water Treatment Works

The board was abolished in 1974 under the terms of the Water Act 1973 and responsibility for the works was transferred to the new Severn Trent Water Authority.
