= Derwent Reservoir (Derbyshire) =

Reservoir in Derbyshire, England

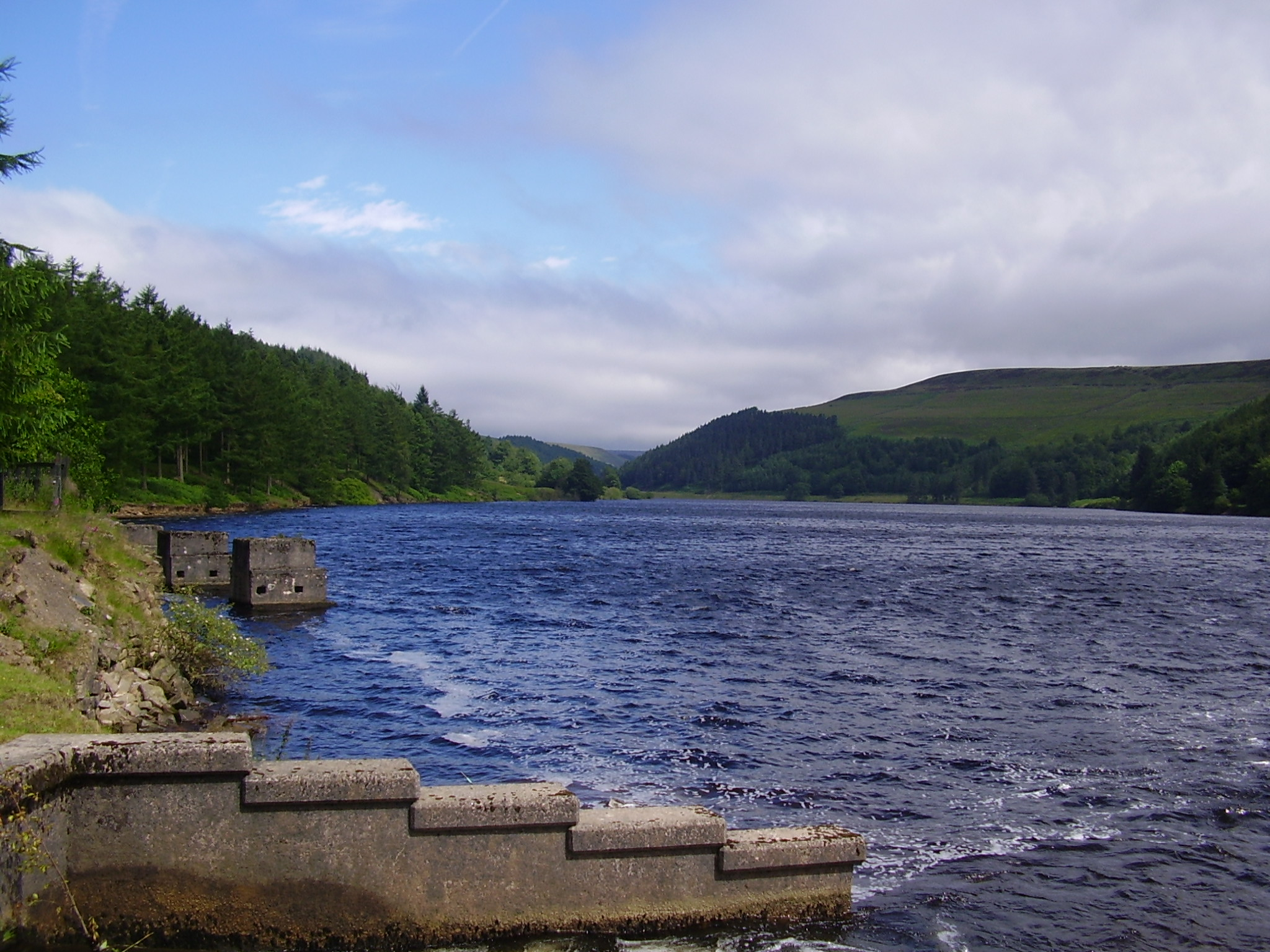
- Derwent Reservoir in July 2007

- Location within Derbyshire
- Location: Derbyshire
- Coordinates: 53°24′45″N 1°44′35″W
- Lake type: Reservoir
- Primary inflows: River Derwent
- Primary outflows: River Derwent
- Basin countries: United Kingdom
- Max. length: 3.05 km (1.90 mi)
- Max. width: 0.3 km (0.19 mi)
- Surface area: 70.8 ha (175 acres)
- Max. depth: 34.7 m (114 ft)
- Islands: 1

Derwent Reservoir is the middle of three reservoirs in the Upper Derwent Valley in the north of Derbyshire, England. It lies approximately 10 mi (16 km) from Glossop and 10 mi (16 km) from Sheffield. The River Derwent flows first through Howden Reservoir, then Derwent Reservoir and finally through Ladybower Reservoir. Between them they provide practically all of Derbyshire's water, as well as supplying a large part of South Yorkshire and as far afield as Nottingham and Leicester.

Derwent Reservoir is around 1.5 mi (2.4 km) in length, running broadly north–south, with Howden Dam at the northern end and Derwent Dam at the south. A small island lies near the Howden Dam. The Abbey Brook flows into the reservoir from the east.

At full capacity the reservoir covers an area of 70.8 ha (175 acres) and at its deepest point is 34.7 m (114 ft) deep.

== History ==
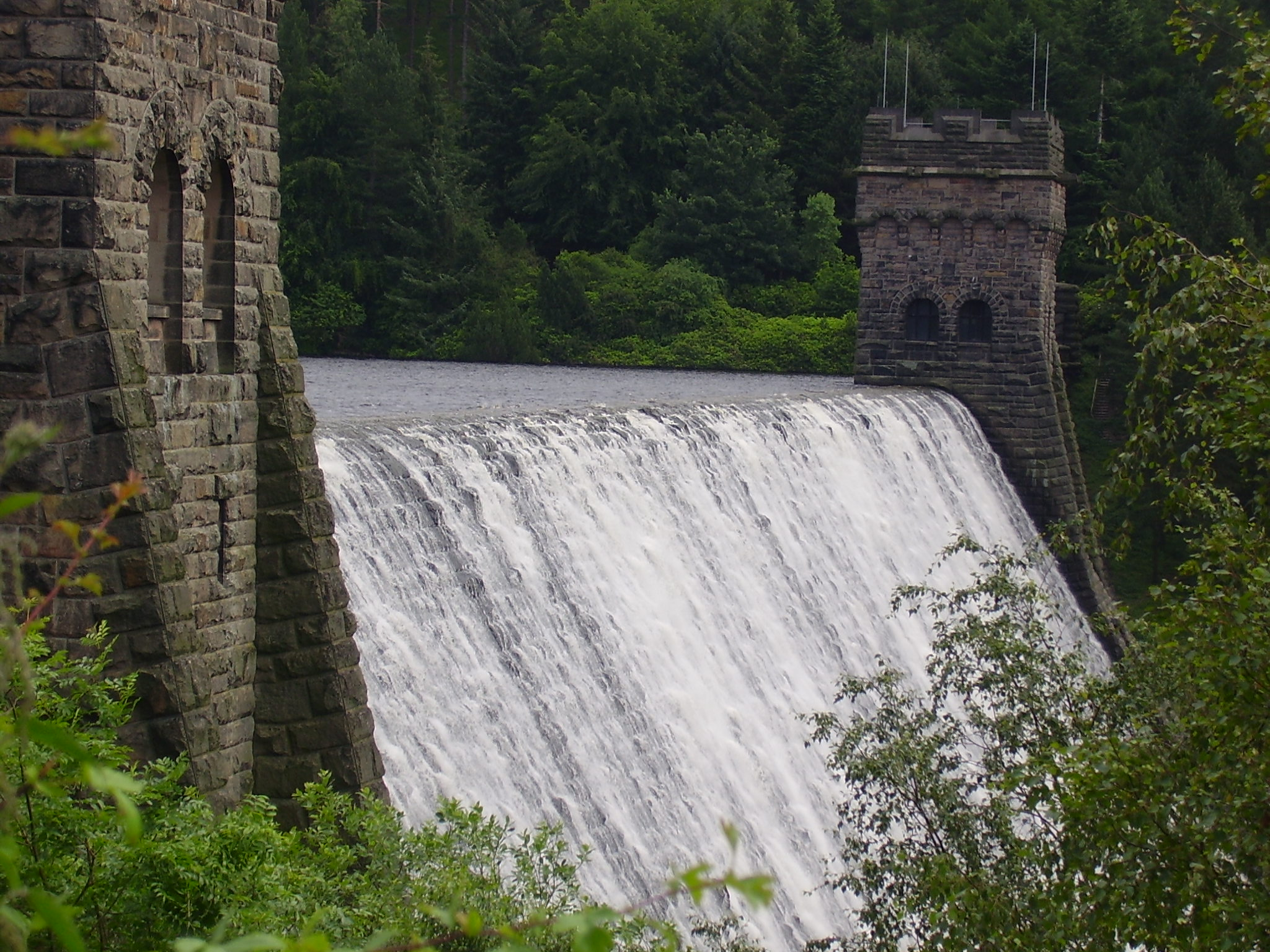
Derwent Dam in full flow (11 July 2007)

The Industrial Revolution and urbanisation of the 19th century created huge demand for water in the industrial cities of the East Midlands and South Yorkshire. The proximity of Sheffield and its neighbours to the Upper Derwent valley were thus factors in the decision to dam the valley to create the Howden and Derwent reservoirs.

Construction of the neo-Gothic solid masonry dam began in 1902, a year after the building of Howden commenced, and proved a mammoth task. The chief engineer was Edward Sandeman. He was also in charge of building nearby Howden dam and he was awarded the Telford Medal in 1918 for his work ‘Derwent Valley Waterworks’. The huge stones that formed the walls of the dam were carried along a specially created railway from the quarries at Bole Hill near Grindleford. Over 1,000 workers lived in a specially constructed self-contained town called Birchinlee or "Tin Town". One of the metal huts was preserved and moved to the village of Hope, where it is now a hairdressing salon. The workers who died during the building of the dam were buried in Bamford Church.

The filling of the reservoir began in November 1914, and overflowed for the first time in January 1916, with the water almost immediately passing into supply. The dam can support a total of 9.64 million cubic metres (340 million cubic feet) of water.

Only two years after the dam's completion in 1916, it was decided that the flow from the reservoir was insufficient to support the surrounding population. As a result, between 1920 and 1931 the rivers Alport and Ashop were also diverted from the Ashop valley into the reservoir using tunnels and a Venturi flume.

This diversion helped hold back water during the construction of the Ladybower Reservoir to the south, which was constructed between 1935 and 1945.

== Bamford and Howden Railway ==
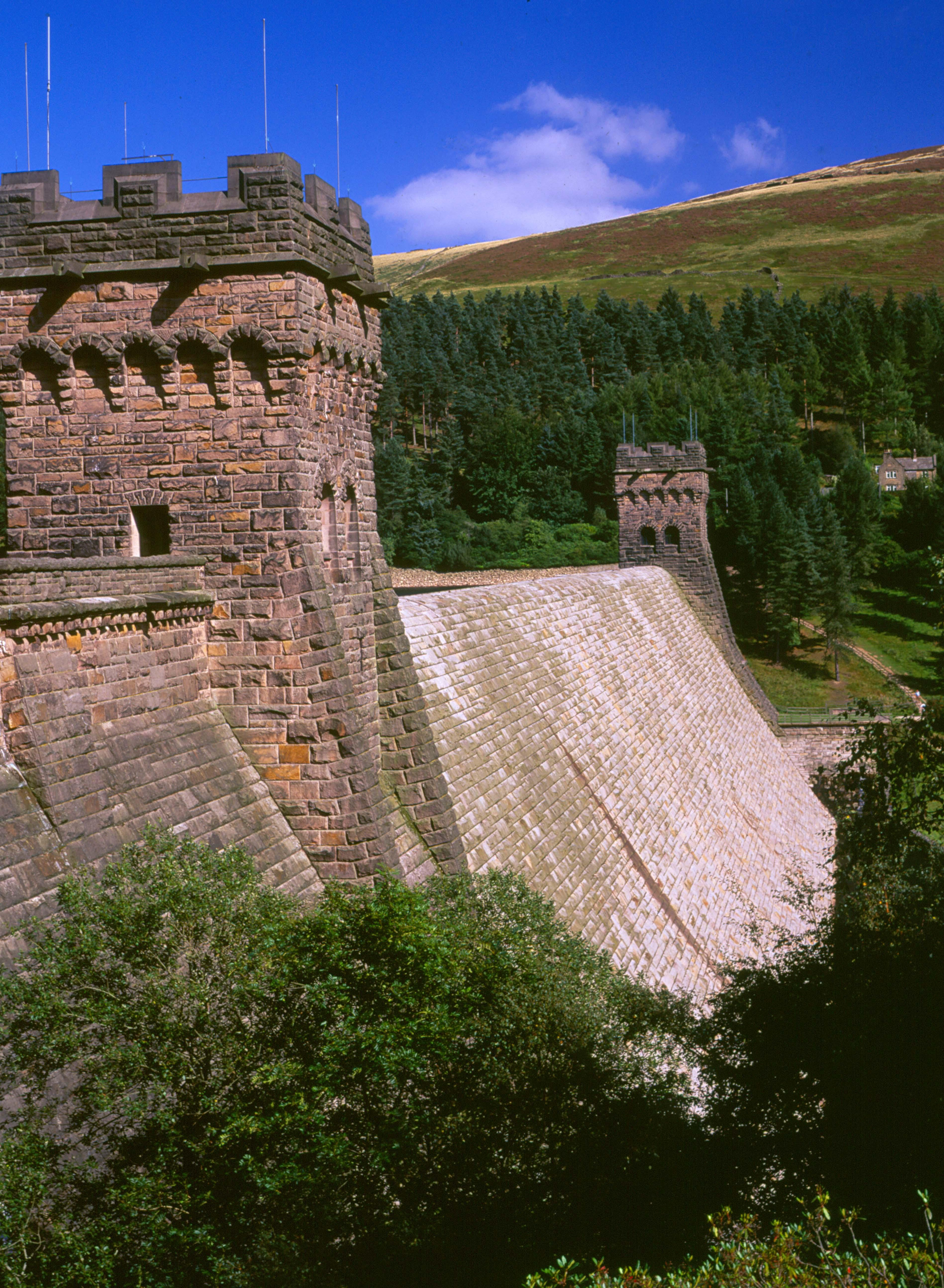
Dam wall (16 March 2009)

Between 1901 and 1903 a standard-gauge railway of over 7 mi (11 km) was built from the village of Bamford to the south of the reservoir to Howden, to carry the thousands of tons of stone required for the construction of the two dams. Near the southern end lay the newly opened quarry at Bole Hill near Grindleford.

Remains of the railway can still be seen alongside Derwent Reservoir as well as at the western end of the Ladybower dam where over 1.5 mi (2.4 km) of cutting and trackway remain, and are known locally as 'The Route'. Between the Howden and Derwent dams the present road was built over the top of the railway.

After supplying well over a million tons of stone the Bole Hill quarry was closed in September 1914, with the end of the railway following soon after. The section between the mainline railway at Hope and Yorkshire Bridge was relaid in 1935 to aid the construction of the Ladybower dam, but closed again in 1946.

== Countryside ==
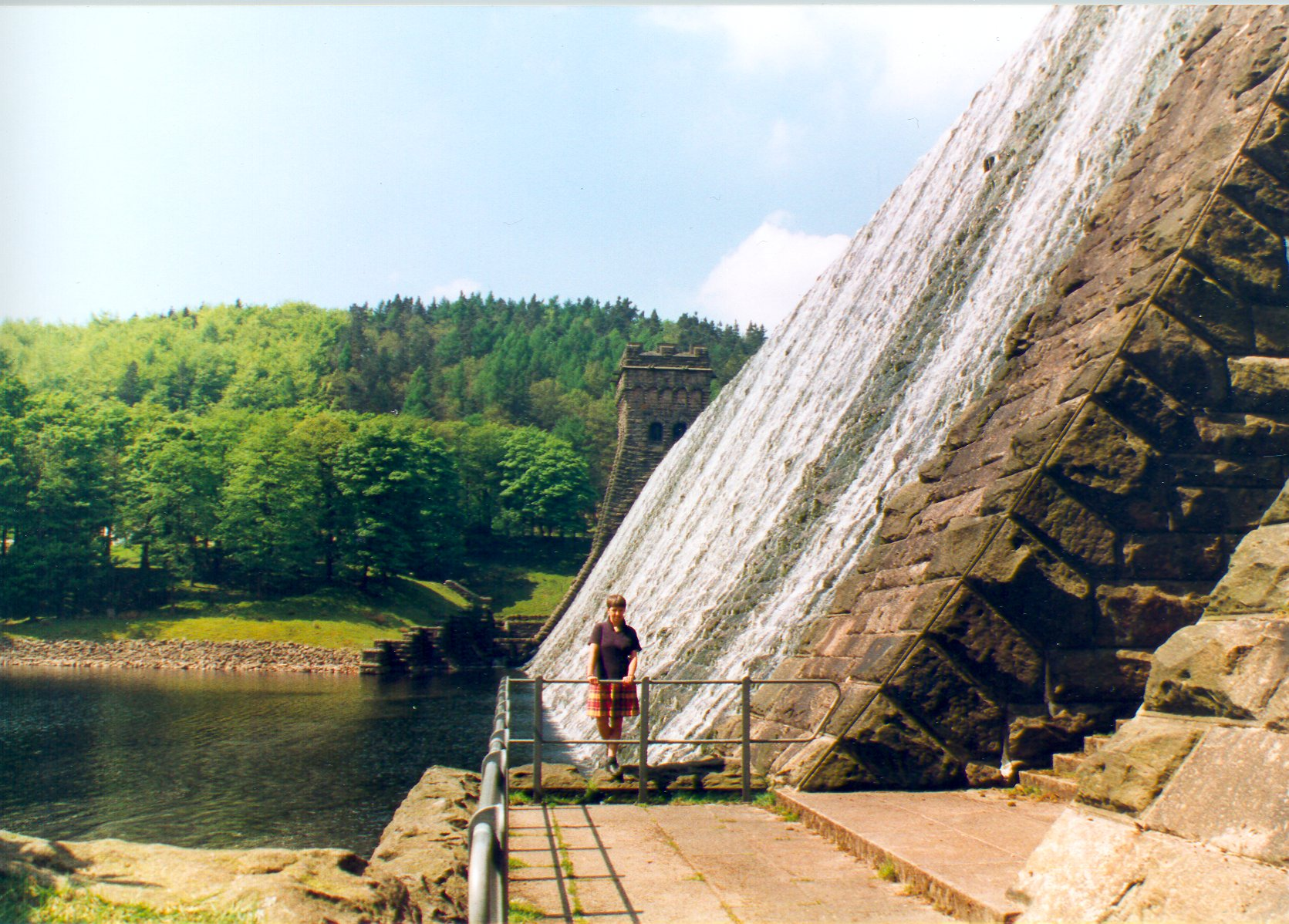
The base of the dam (2001)

The majority of the land around the reservoir is owned by Severn Trent Water, and of that around half is woodland. The woods consist predominantly of larch, pine, and spruce conifers, with the remaining third mainly sycamore, beech and oak.

The hills of the Peak District are given over to the pasture of sheep, leased to local farmers. The moorlands and gritstone edges are criss-crossed by footpaths open year-round other than during selected shooting periods.

A stone memorial to Tip, a sheepdog, stands on the bank of the reservoir. Tip remained with the body of local shepherd, Joseph Tagg, for 105 days after he died on Howden Moor in the winter of 1953-54. Tip was awarded the Bronze Medal of the Canine Defence League.

== Dambusters ==
During the Second World War, the reservoir was used by pilots of the 617 Squadron for practising the low-level flights needed for Operation Chastise (commonly known as the "Dam Busters" raids), due to its similarity to the German dams. Today there is a commemorative plaque to 617 Squadron on the dam, and one of the towers on the dam housed the Derwent Valley Museum. The exhibition, now closed, was owned and run by the late Vic Hallam, and covered stories of 617 Squadron and its training for Operation Chastise. It also had a display on the history of the Derwent valley and the lost villages of Derwent and Ashopton.

Occasional flypasts of the Battle of Britain Memorial Flight at the reservoir are also staged to commemorate the events during the war. In September 2014, a unique flypast took place with the two remaining airworthy Lancasters, one from the Battle of Britain Memorial Flight, and one from Canada, flying three passes in formation.

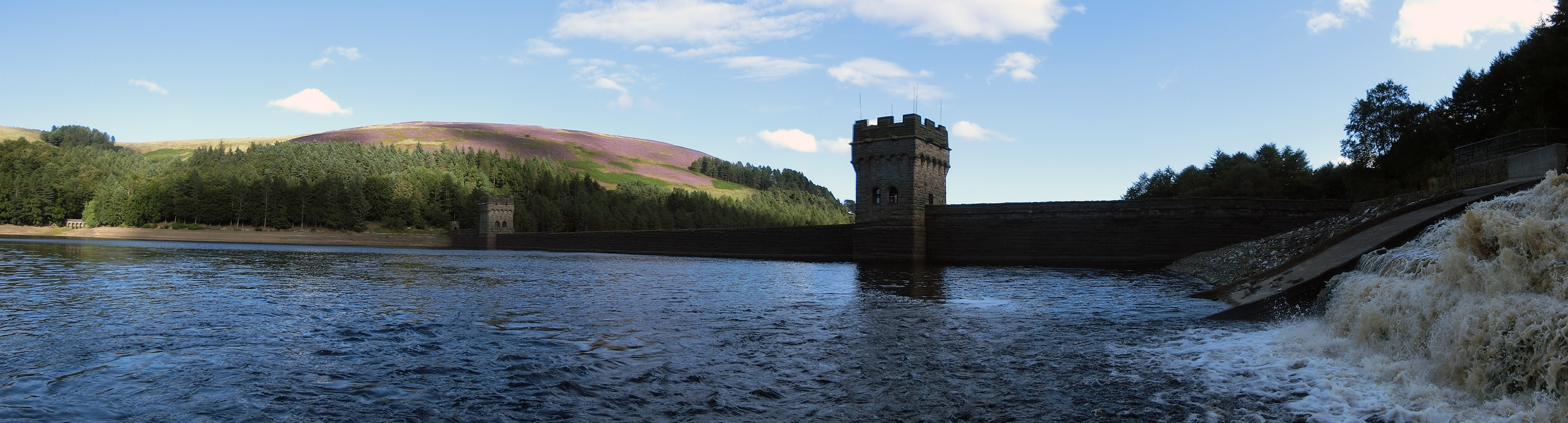
Derwent Dam from the top of the dam (August 2017)

== See also ==
- Listed buildings in Derwent, Derbyshire
