= Ashopton =

Former village in Derbyshire, England

Coordinates: 53.37°N 01.71°W

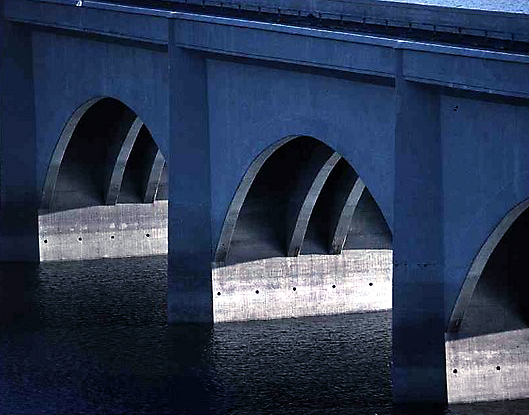
- The Ashopton Viaduct arches

- Location within Derbyshire
- Population: 0
- OS grid reference: SK1986
- District: High Peak
- Shire county: Derbyshire
- Region: East Midlands
- Country: England
- Sovereign state: United Kingdom
- Post town: HOPE VALLEY
- Postcode district: S33
- Dialling code: 01433
- Police: Derbyshire
- Fire: Derbyshire
- Ambulance: East Midlands
- UK Parliament: High Peak

Ashopton was a small village in Derbyshire, England, in the valley of the River Ashop. The village population was less than 100. Details are included in the civil parish of Aston, Derbyshire. In the early 1940s, the village (along with neighbouring Derwent) was demolished to make way for the filling of Ladybower Reservoir.

== History ==
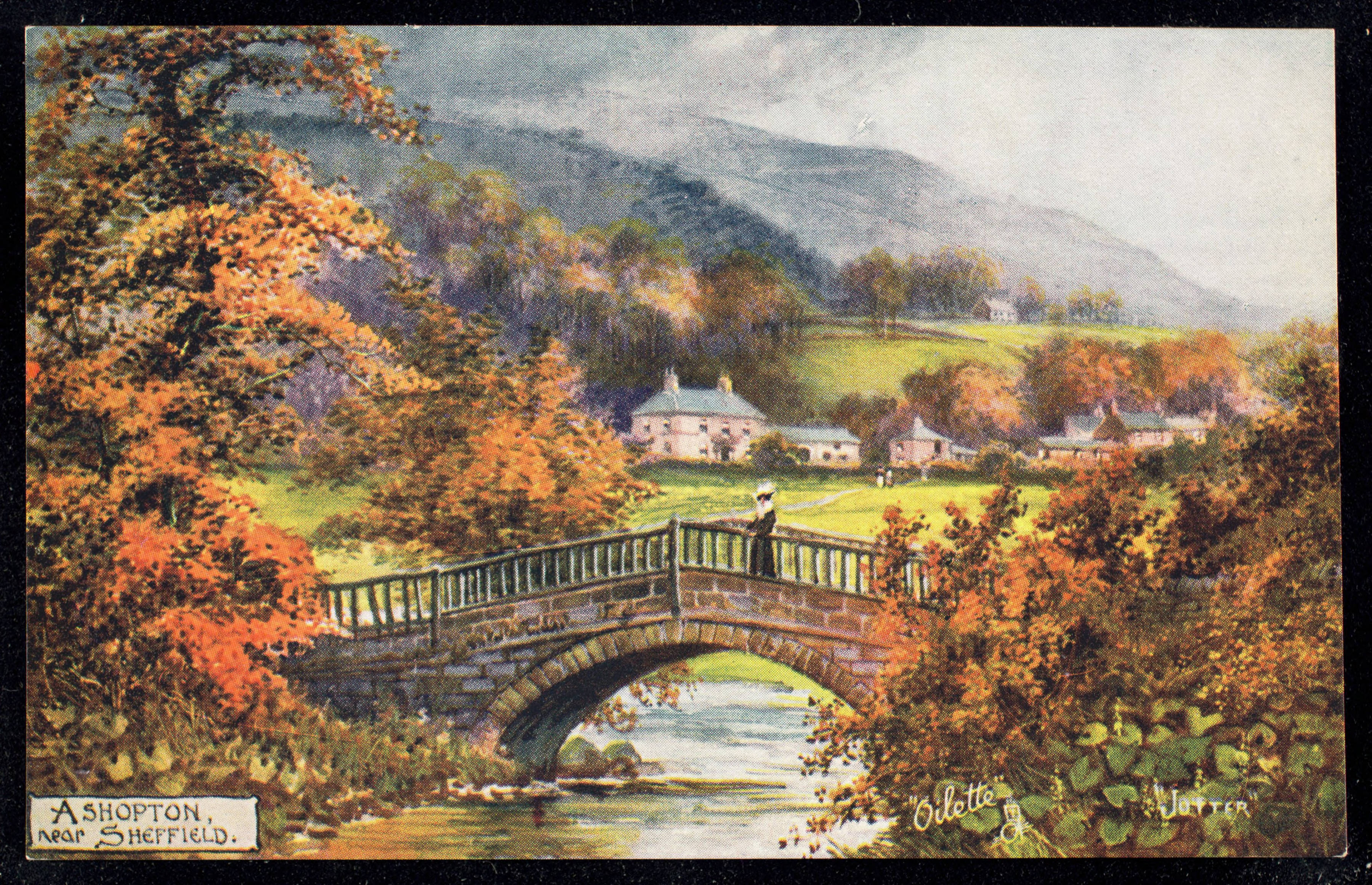
Postcard painting of Ashopton, 1900s

The village was in the chapelry of Derwent. In 1829, Stephen Glover wrote that the village hosted a wool fair on 29 July; he suggested that this was intended to be a tradition continued annually on the last Wednesday of July.

The village was located near where the Derwent Valley joins the Snake Valley (route of the current A57 Snake Pass to Glossop). There are several reminders of the village. One is in the name of the Ashopton Viaduct which carries the A57 across the mouth of the Derwent Valley. The main part of the village was immediately south of the viaduct. Other reminders of the village include Ashopton Sawmill and Ashopton Cottage.

Unlike the remains of Derwent village, which have become visible when water levels have dropped, Ashopton will never re-emerge from the waters of Ladybower as silt has already covered the remains of its buildings.

A key part of the village was the Methodist Chapel, built in 1840. The final service was held at the chapel on 25 September 1939. The final hymn sung was "The Day's Dying in the West". The chapel was finally demolished, along with the remaining buildings in the village, in 1943.

The Derwent Valley Museum was located in the western tower of the Derwent Reservoir dam wall and run privately by the late Vic Hallam. It told the history of the Derwent valley and of Derwent and Ashopton as well as the tale of RAF Squadron 617 and its training for Operation Chastise during the Second World War. The museum has now closed.
