= Listed buildings in Derwent, Derbyshire =

Derwent is a civil parish in the High Peak district of Derbyshire, England. The parish contains four listed buildings that are recorded in the National Heritage List for England. All the listed buildings are designated at Grade II, the lowest of the three grades, which is applied to "buildings of national importance and special interest". Following the building of Ladybower Reservoir the village of Derwent was flooded. The listed buildings consist of the dam at the south end of the Derwent Reservoir, a war memorial moved from the village, a farmhouse and outbuilding, and a house and former school, later a community centre.

== Buildings ==
Name and location	Photograph	Date	Notes
High House Farmhouse, outbuilding and walls 53.39443°N 1.71527°W	—	Late 18th century	The farmhouse and attached outbuilding to the right are in gritstone, and are in ruins. In front of the house is a dry stone garden wall.
St Henrys and Community Centre; 53.39586°N 1.72722°W		1877	A house and school, the school later a community centre, they are in gritstone, and have stone slate roofs with coped gables and moulded kneelers. The former school has a single storey, and the house forms a two-storey cross-wing at the east end. The house has three bays, and contains a doorway with a chamfered surround and a Tudor arched head, and to the right is a two-storey canted bay window. The school has a gabled porch with a round-arched entrance that has a chamfered surround, over which is a round-arched niche containing a statue of the Virgin Mary. On the west gable is a cupola bellcote corbelled out on a buttress. The windows in the house and school are mullioned and transomed, or just mullioned or transomed.
Derwent Dam; 53.40493°N 1.74198°W		1902–16	The dam at the southern end of Derwent Reservoir is in gritstone with a core of large stone blocks set in concrete, and is 1,110 feet (340 m) long and 114 feet (35 m) high. Towards each end is an embattled tower with an arched corbel table, containing a doorway and small arched windows. At each end is a massive rusticated gateway, the entrance arches with vermiculated blocks forming a pseudo-Gibbs surround, and a solid pediment. Linking the gate piers to the tower are parapet walls with a dentilled cornice.
Derwent Woodlands War Memorial; 53.39126°N 1.72687°W		Early 1920s	The war memorial was moved from Derwent village to its present site in an enclosure by the roadside overlooking Ladybower Reservoir in about 1940. It is in gritstone and consists of a wheel-head cross with a tapered shaft on a deep plinth on a three-stepped base. On the northwest face are plaques with an inscription and the names of those lost in the First World War. The memorial has a paved surround, and is enclosed by a low gritstone wall with low half-round copings and piers with domed caps.
