= River Alport =

Alport
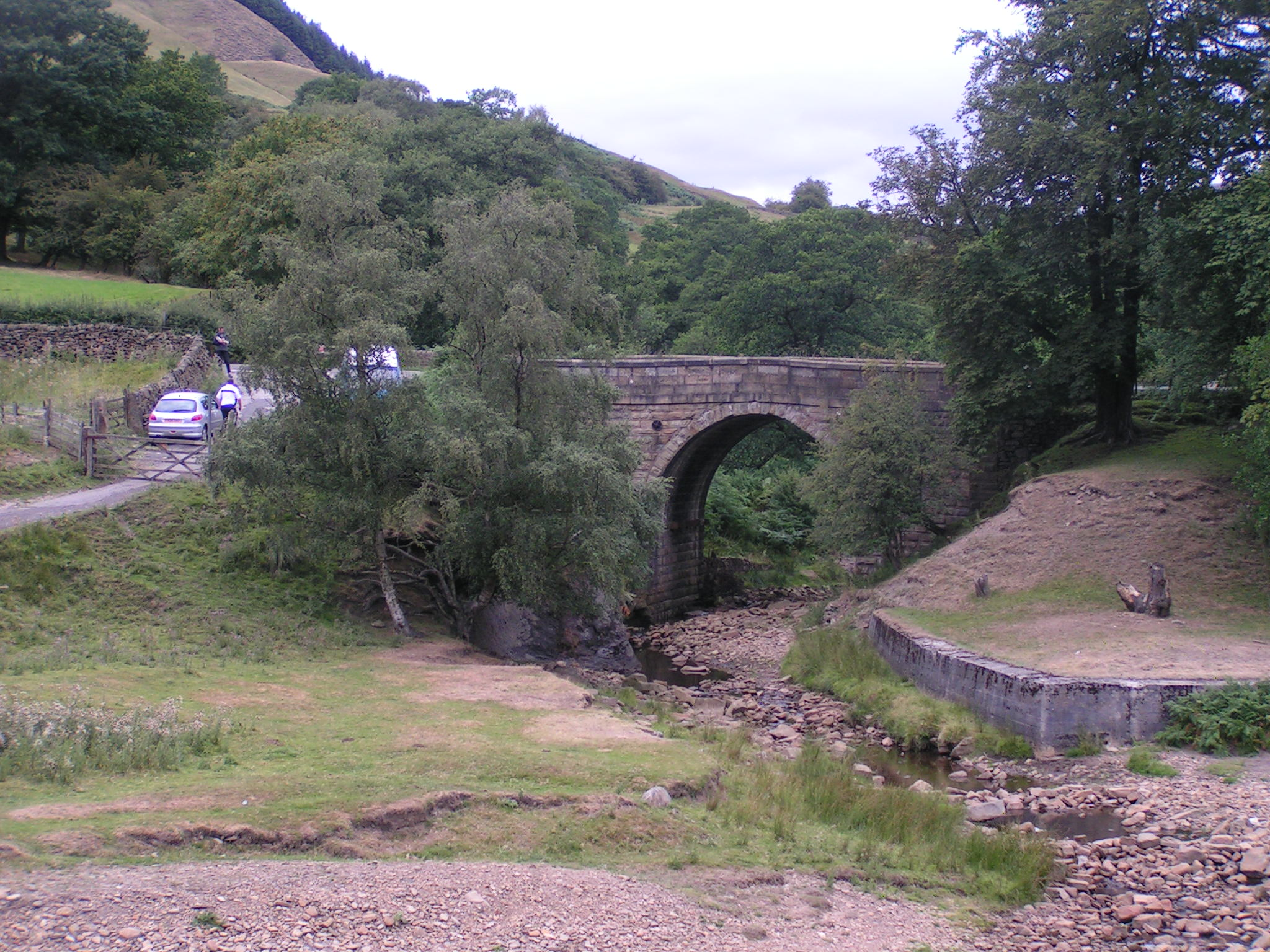
- Alport Bridge, which conveys the A57 road over the River Alport just above its confluence with the Ashop

Location
- Country: England
- Region: Derbyshire

Physical characteristics
- Source
  - location: Bleaklow, England
- Mouth
  - location: Derbyshire, England
  - coordinates: 53.402518°N 1.788492°W
- Length: 9 km (5.6 mi)

The River Alport flows for 5.6 miles (9 km) in the Dark Peak of the Peak District in Derbyshire, England. Its source is on Bleaklow, 3 miles (4.8 km) east of Glossop, from which it flows south through the Grains in the Water bog, then over gritstone below the Alport Castles landslide to Alport Bridge on the A57 Snake Pass route from Sheffield to Manchester, where it joins the River Ashop. The Ashop flows into Ladybower Reservoir about 2.5 miles (4.0 km) down the valley, which discharges via the Rivers Derwent and Trent to the North Sea. The source of the Alport is close to the Pennine watershed.

The course of the river includes three small waterfalls. At its southern end lie the remains of a tunnel constructed to carry water to a planned but unbuilt cotton mill. A weir was built on the river in about 1922 and a short watercourse added to feed the water into the Ashop weir located upstream of the confluence. The water was then culverted along the valley to the Ashop Siphon near Hagg Farm, where it then crossed over the River Ashop in a 6-foot-diameter (1.8 m) steel pipe 273 yards (250 m) long, passed through a 1,065-yard (974 m) tunnel under the hill and then via another open watercourse of 761 yards (696 m) to discharge into the Derwent Reservoir a few yards north of the dam wall. The outlet is visible from the viewing area.

The valley of the Alport contains some farmland, but the banks of the valley are mostly coniferous plantations and heath. The coniferous plantations are being converted to semi-natural deciduous woodland. The small hamlet of Alport lies on the west bank near the southern end of the river.

== Water quality ==
The Environment Agency assesses the water quality within the river systems in England. Each is given an overall ecological status, which may be one of five levels: high, good, moderate, poor and bad. There are several components that are used to determine this, including biological status, which looks at the quantity and varieties of invertebrates, angiosperms and fish. Chemical status, which compares the concentrations of various chemicals against known safe concentrations, is rated good or fail.

The water quality of the River Alport catchment was as follows in 2019/2022:

Section	Ecological Status	Chemical Status	Length	Catchment
Alport Catchment (trib of Ashop)	Good	Fail	3.1 miles (5.0 km)	4.38 square miles (11.3 km^{2})

Like most rivers in the UK, the chemical status changed from good to fail in 2019, because of the presence of polybrominated diphenyl ethers (PBDE), which had not previously been included in the assessment.
