= River Westend =

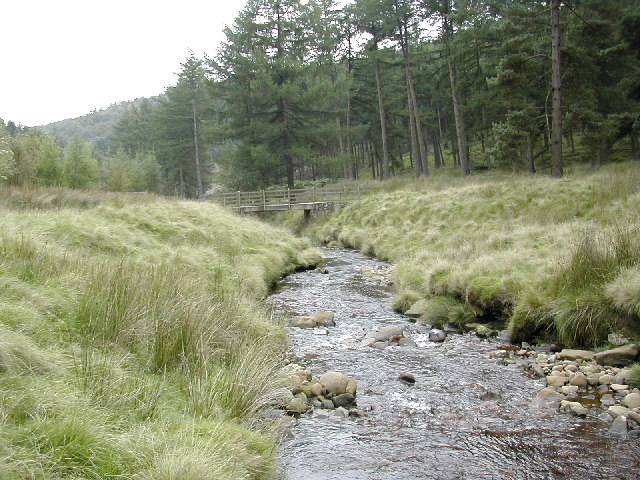
- The River Westend

- Location within Derbyshire

Location
- Country: England
- Counties: Derbyshire

Physical characteristics
- Source
  - location: Bleaklow Stones, Bleaklow, Derbyshire
- Mouth
  - location: Howden Reservoir, Derbyshire
  - coordinates: 53.43120°N 1.74467°W
- Length: 3.2 km (2.0 mi)
- Basin size: 14.8 km^{2} (5.7 sq mi)

Basin features
- Tributaries
  - left: Grinah Grain, Fagney Clough, Ridge Clough
  - right: Ravens Clough, Black Clough, Ditch Clough

The River Westend flows through the Dark Peak of the Derbyshire Peak District in England. Its source is at Bleaklow Stones on Bleaklow, from where it flows south east into a western arm of the Howden Reservoir. Its lower reaches run through a forestry plantation.

Tributaries of the river include Ravens Clough, Black Clough, Fagney Clough, Green Clough and Grinah Grain.

== See also ==
- List of rivers in England
