= Yorkshire Bridge =

Hamlet in Derbyshire, England

Coordinates: 53.361°N 1.704°W

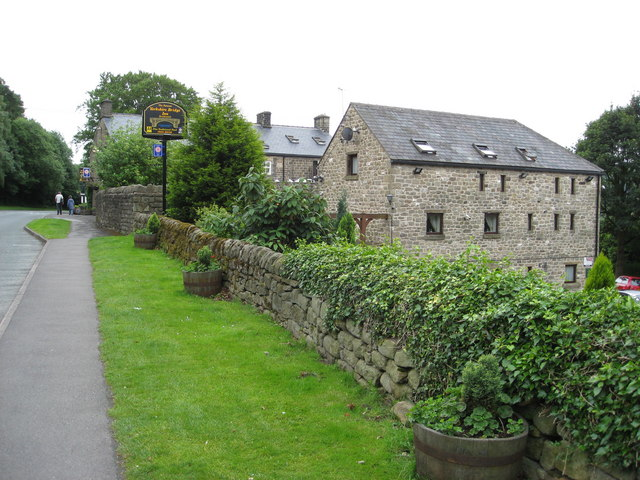
- Yorkshire Bridge Public House

- Location within Derbyshire
- OS grid reference: SK197849
- District: High Peak
- Shire county: Derbyshire
- Region: East Midlands
- Country: England
- Sovereign state: United Kingdom
- Post town: HOPE VALLEY
- Postcode district: S33
- Dialling code: 01433
- Police: Derbyshire
- Fire: Derbyshire
- Ambulance: East Midlands
- UK Parliament: High Peak

Yorkshire Bridge is a small hamlet at grid reference SK200850 near the Ladybower Reservoir dam in the English county of Derbyshire. Administratively the area forms part of the civil parish of Bamford and the district of High Peak. The people who built the Ladybower Dam wall lived in the houses at Yorkshire Bridge.

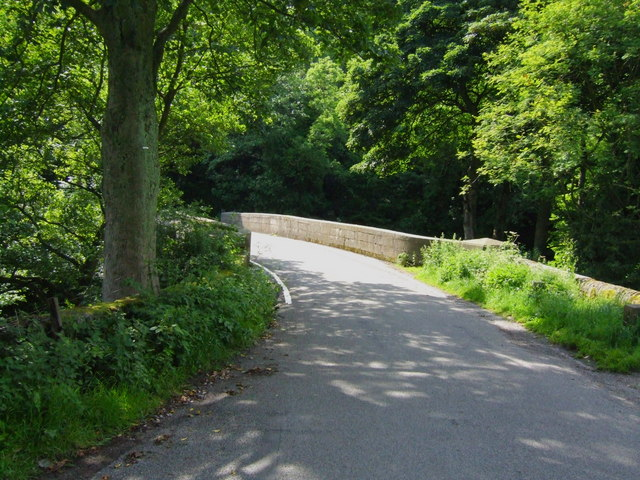
Yorkshire Bridge

The settlement is named after a packhorse bridge, which crosses the River Derwent to the south of the dam of the Ladybower Reservoir from which the river has emerged and north of the village of Thornhill.

It has also given its name to a public house on the nearby A6013 road that is popular with walkers. The Derwent Valley Heritage Way has its northern terminus in the woods overlooking the reservoir.
