= River Ashop =

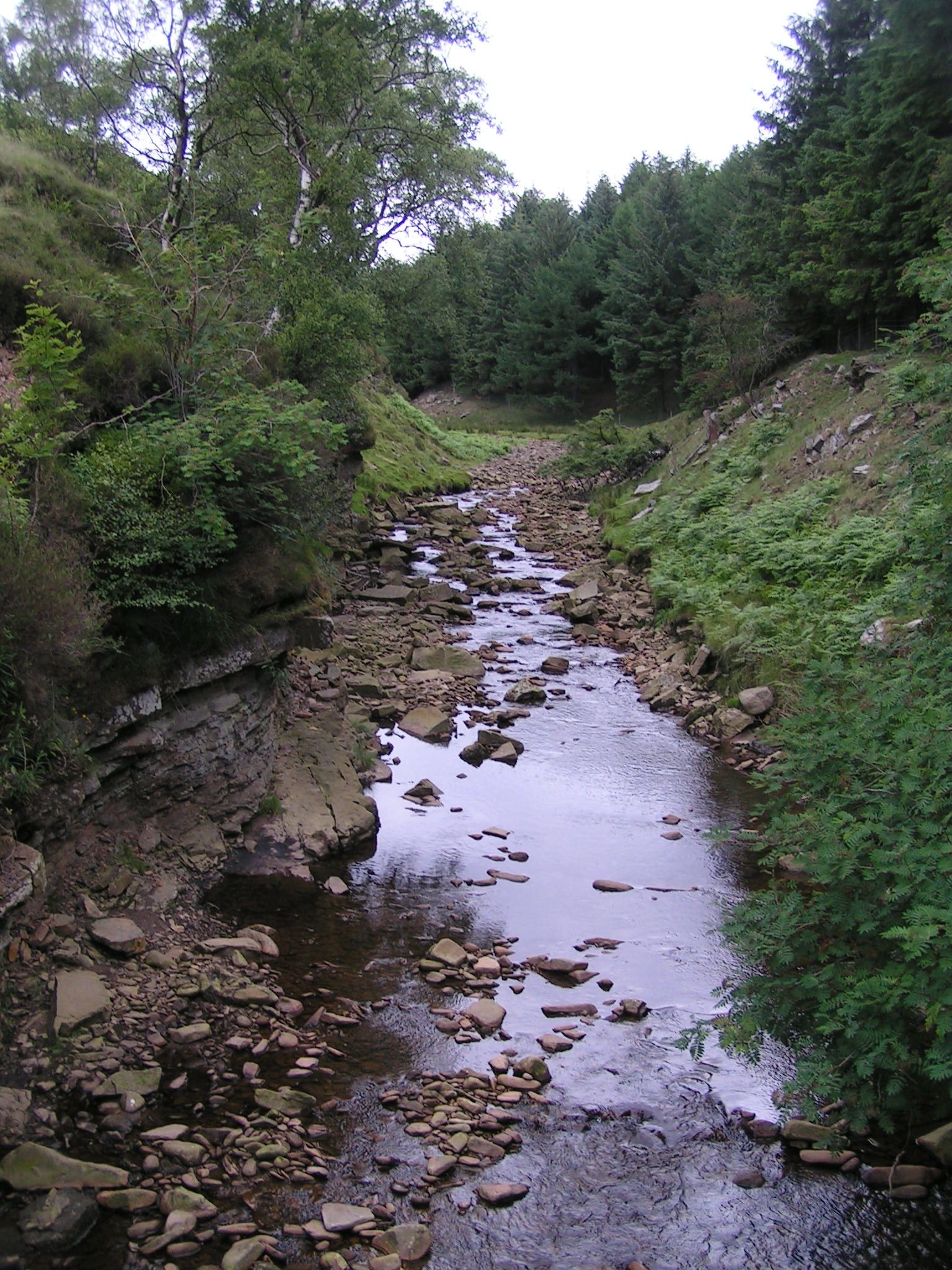
- The River Ashop in Snake Woodlands

- Location within Derbyshire
- Etymology: Old English æsc-hop, "Ash Valley"

Location
- Country: England
- Counties: Derbyshire

Physical characteristics
- Source
  - location: Ashop Head, Black Ashop Moor, Derbyshire
- Mouth
  - location: Ladybower Reservoir, Derbyshire
  - coordinates: 53.372985°N 1.710658°W
- Length: 10 km (6.2 mi)
- Basin size: 49.5 km^{2} (19.1 sq mi)

Basin features
- Tributaries
  - left: River Alport
  - right: Fair Brook, Blackden Brook

The River Ashop is a river in the Derbyshire Peak District, England. Its source is on the eastern slopes of Mill Hill, three miles south east of Glossop and just north of Kinder Scout.

The river flows approximately ten kilometres east, following the Sheffield to Manchester Snake Pass road through remote countryside, before emptying into Ladybower Reservoir, which itself flows into the River Derwent.

The only significant tributary of the River Ashop is the short River Alport. The flow of the Alport is partially diverted by a weir to feed into the Ashop above the impound weir built in the 1920s to increase the catchment area of the Derwent Reservoir prior to the building of the Ladybower Reservoir downstream. The weir impounded the water and fed it into an open culvert (water conduit) that was built along the side of the hill. The culvert then feeds into a siphon over the river in a 6-foot-diameter (1.8 m) iron pipe before entering a tunnel to pass through the hill to the Derwent Reservoir via an open watercourse, entering the reservoir just north of the dam wall. The concrete structure of the weir is visible when travelling up the Snake Pass route from Sheffield.

== Recreational use ==
The river is occasionally used for recreational purposes, such as kayaking. This is usually limited to periods after heavy rainfall when the river is in spate, because in times of normal flows the river is too shallow to use. When the river is in spate it becomes very technical, with many weirs and holes. The river is quite narrow and relatively shallow, making the rocky bed hazardous for kayakers who capsize. By far the most challenging part is in the higher-volume upper section of the river, where a small tributary of the Ashop flows swiftly through a steep tunnel under the road. The river has many obstacles such as fallen trees, and fences which lie across the channel and must be negotiated. This makes it dangerous at times of high water if the river is flowing rapidly.

== See also ==
- Rivers of the United Kingdom
