= Howden Reservoir =

Reservoir in the Peak District, England

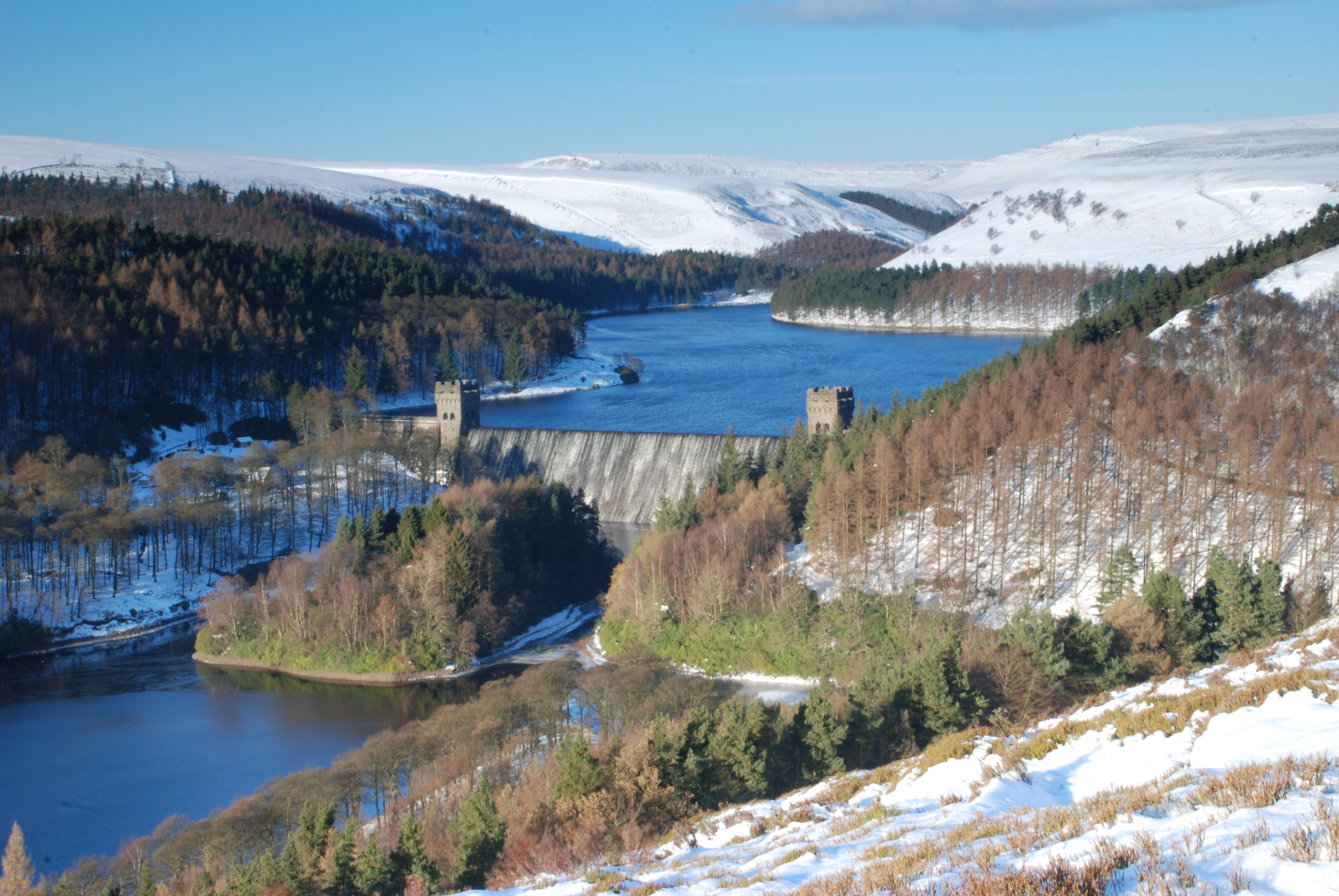
- Howden Dam from Abbey Bank (Dec 2010)

- Location within Derbyshire
- Location: Derbyshire and South Yorkshire
- Coordinates: 53°26′N 1°45′W
- Lake type: reservoir
- Primary inflows: River Derwent, River Westend, Howden Clough and Linch Clough
- Primary outflows: River Derwent
- Basin countries: United Kingdom

The Howden Reservoir is a Y-shaped reservoir, the uppermost of the three in the Upper Derwent Valley, England. The western half of the reservoir lies in Derbyshire and the eastern half is in Sheffield, South Yorkshire; the county border runs through the middle of the reservoir, following the original path of the River Derwent. The longest arm is around 1 1/4 mi (2.0 km) in length. The reservoir is bounded at the southern end by Howden Dam; below this, the Derwent flows immediately into Derwent Reservoir and subsequently the Ladybower Reservoir. Other tributaries include the River Westend, Howden Clough and Linch Clough.

Work commenced on the dam's construction on 16 July 1901 and completed in July 1912. The chief engineer was Edward Sandeman. He was also in charge of building nearby Derwent dam and was awarded the Telford Medal in 1918 for his work "Derwent Valley Waterworks". The works involved constructing a temporary village at Birchinlee, or "Tin Town", for the workers, a temporary railway line from the main line at Bamford, construction of a link aqueduct to the Derwent Dam. The dam is of solid masonry construction, and 117 ft (36 m) tall, 1,080 ft (330 m) long, and impounds 1,900,000 imp gal (8,600 kl) of water, from a catchment area of 5,155 acres (2,086 ha). The workers who died during the construction of the dam were buried in St John the Baptist's Church, Bamford.

To the east of the reservoir stands Featherbed Moss, one of the highest tops in the area at 1,788 ft (545 m), and one of several tops of that name in the area. This is not to be confused with the more well-known Featherbed Moss on the Pennine Way between Kinder Scout and Bleaklow.

Around Howden Reservoir
Reservoir and dam (July 2007)

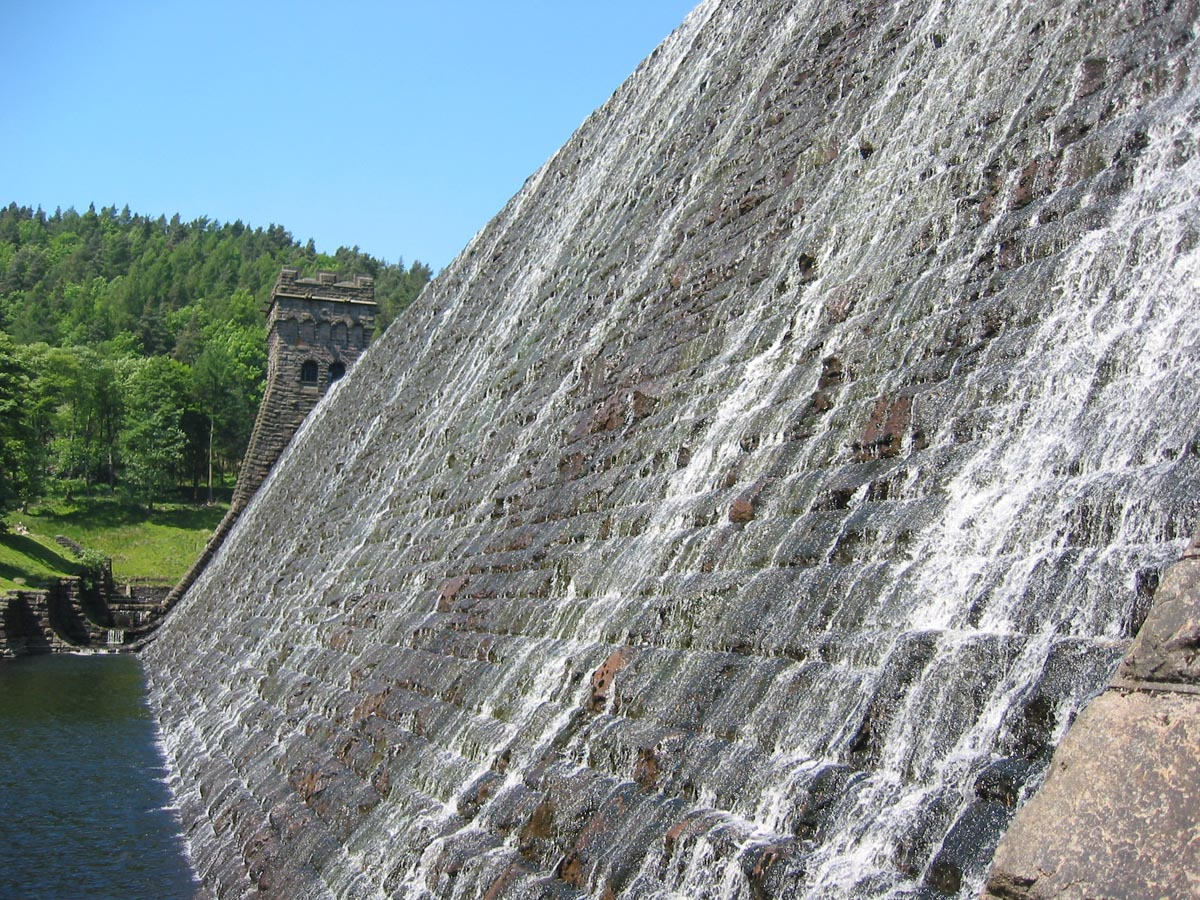
Base of Howden Dam, from Derwent Reservoir

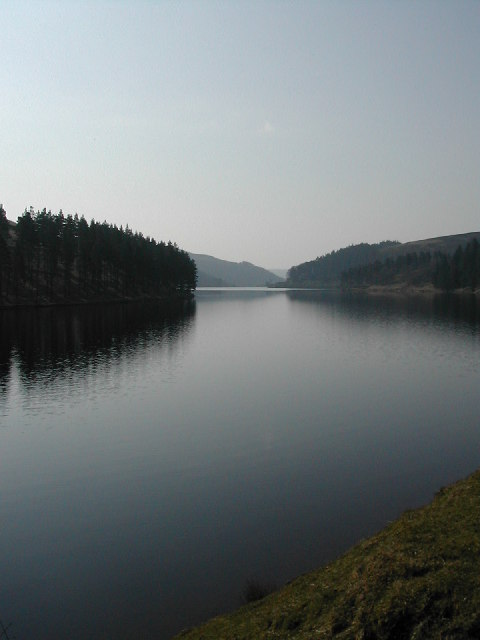
Looking South along Howden Reservoir from the Kings Tree turn around

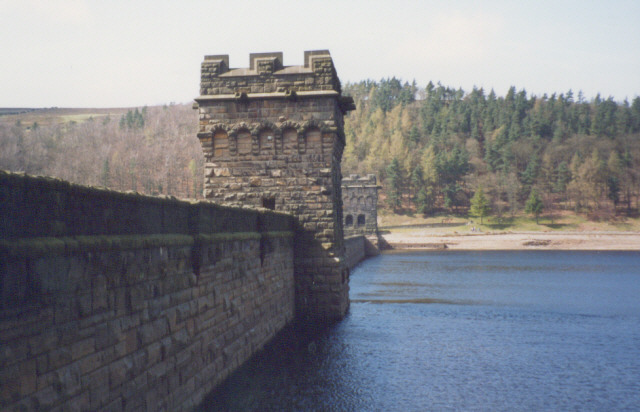
Howden Dam (reservoir side)
