= Ladybower Reservoir =

Reservoir in Derbyshire, England

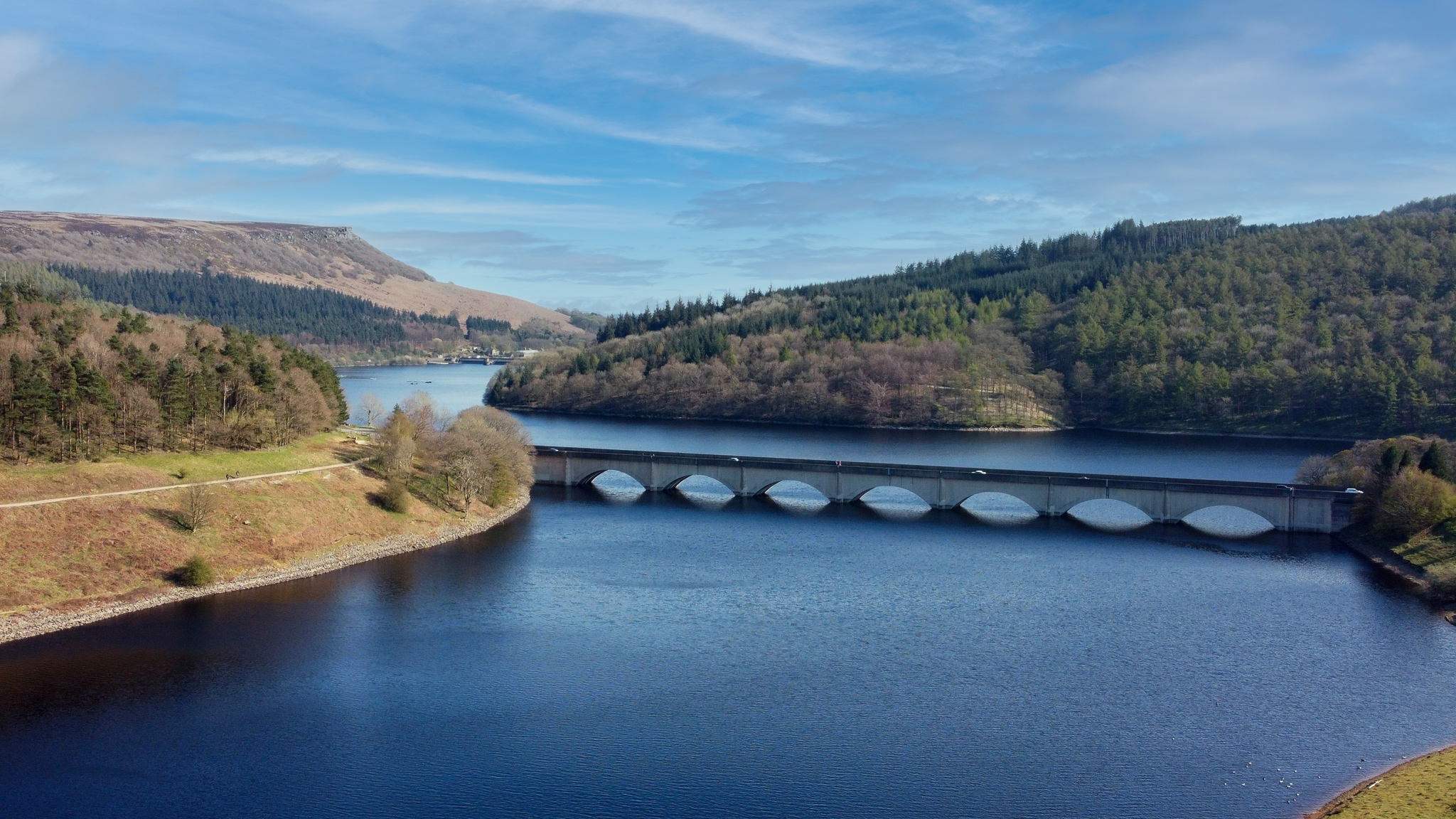
- An aerial view of Ladybower Reservoir with Bamford Edge in the distance

- Location within Derbyshire Location within England
- Location: Upper Derwent Valley, Derbyshire
- Coordinates: 53°23′N 1°43′W
- Lake type: reservoir
- Primary inflows: River Ashop, River Derwent
- Primary outflows: River Derwent
- Catchment area: 6,364 acres (2,575 ha)
- Basin countries: United Kingdom
- Max. length: 2.5 mi (4.0 km)
- Max. width: 1,950 ft (590 m)
- Surface area: 210 ha (520 acres)
- Average depth: 95 ft (29 m)
- Max. depth: 135 ft (41 m)
- Water volume: 27,800,000 m^{3} (6.1×10^{9} imp gal)
- Shore length^{1}: 13 mi (21 km)
- Surface elevation: 668 ft (204 m)
- ^{1} Shore length is not a well-defined measure.

Ladybower Reservoir is a large Y-shaped, artificial reservoir, the lowest of three in the Upper Derwent Valley in Derbyshire, England. The River Ashop flows into the reservoir from the west; the River Derwent flows south, initially through Howden Reservoir, then Derwent Reservoir, and finally through Ladybower Reservoir. The reservoir is owned by the water company Severn Trent.

The area is now a tourist attraction, with the Fairholmes visitors' centre located at the northern tip of Ladybower. The east arm of the reservoir, fed by the Ladybower Brook, is overlooked by Hordron Edge stone circle.

== Design and construction ==
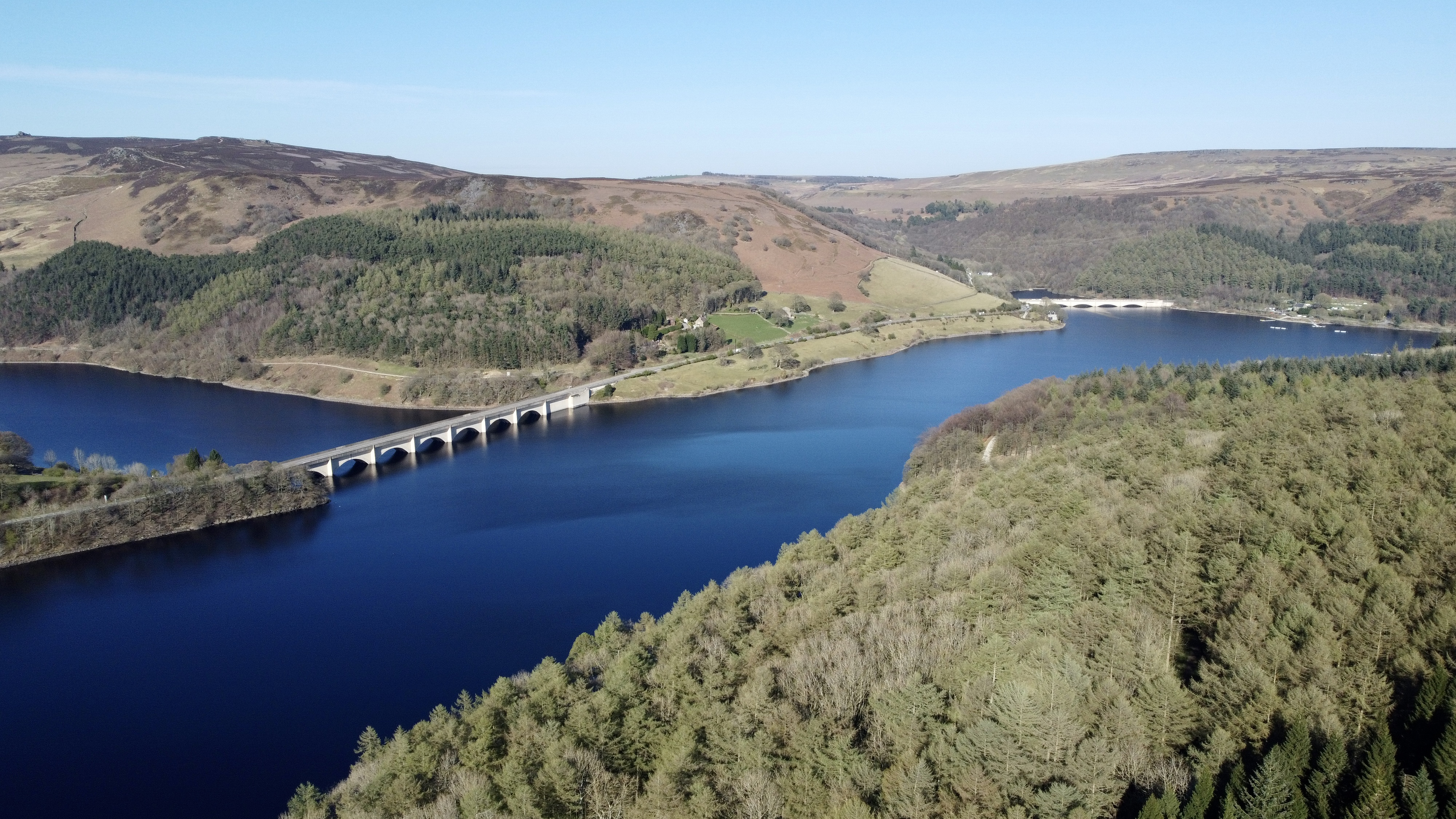
The Ashopton Viaduct (left) carries the Snake Pass A57 road and the Ladybower Viaduct carries the A6013 to Bamford over the reservoir.

Ladybower was built between 1935 and 1943 by the Derwent Valley Water Board to supplement the other two reservoirs in supplying the water needs of the East Midlands. It took a further two years to fill, which was done by 1945. The dam differs from the Howden Reservoir and Derwent Reservoir in that it is a clay-cored earth embankment and not a solid masonry dam. Below the dam is a cut-off trench 180 ft (55 m) deep and 6 ft (1.8 m) wide filled with concrete, stretching 500 ft (150 m) into the hills each side, to stop water leaking around the dam. The dam wall was built by Richard Baillie and Sons, a Scottish company. The two viaducts, Ashopton and Ladybower, needed to carry the trunk roads over the reservoir, were built by the London firm of Holloways, using a steel frame clad in concrete. The project was delayed when the Second World War broke out in 1939, making labour and raw materials scarce, but construction was continued due to the strategic importance of maintaining supplies. King George VI, accompanied by his wife, Queen Elizabeth, formally opened the reservoir on 25 September 1945.

During the 1990s, the wall was raised and strengthened to reduce the risk of over-topping in a major flood. The original dam wall contains 100,000 tons of concrete, over one million tons of earth, and 100,000 tons of clay for the core. The upstream face is stone-faced. Materials were brought to the site on the Derwent Valley Water Board's own branch line and their sidings off the mainline in the Hope Valley.

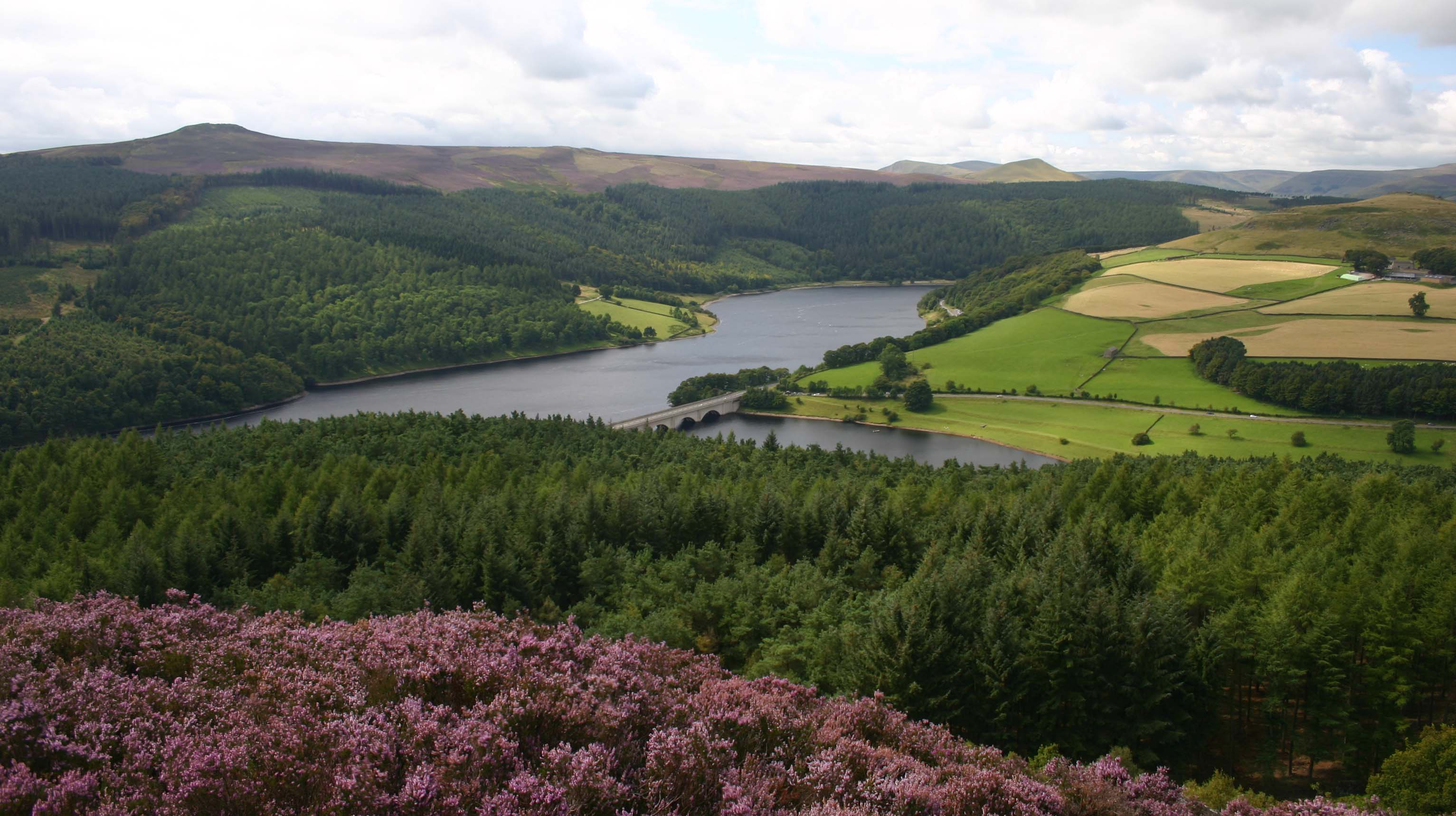
The reservoir

The dam's design is unusual (Note: Although there are not many dams of this design, examples include Pontsticill Reservoir in Wales and Monticello Dam in California.) in having two totally enclosed bellmouth spillway overflows (locally named the "plugholes") at the side of the wall. These are stone and of 78 ft (24 m) diameter with a drop of 66 ft (20 m). The plugholes regulate water levels in the reservoir by draining away excess water when they overflow. The water is then carried to the River Derwent through tunnels. The overflows originally had walkways around them, but they were dismantled many years ago. The plugholes typically overflow in winter months if there has been wet or snowy weather in the nearby hills. According to Severn Trent, the reservoir's operating company, the overflowing plug holes attract many visitors each year.

== Water usage ==
The water is used for river control and to compensate for the water retained by all three dams, along with supply into the drinking water system and hydroelectricity generation. Drinking water must be pumped to treatment works rather than using gravity flow as in the other two reservoirs, increasing costs. The drinking water is treated at Bamford water treatment works by Severn Trent Water. Treated water flows south down the 28 mi (45 km) long Derwent Valley Aqueduct to a covered service reservoir at Ambergate to supply clean water to the cities of Nottingham, Derby and Leicester in the East Midlands of England. The aqueduct passes through the park of Chatsworth House. The path of the aqueduct is marked by a series of valve houses built of stone and domed steel access chambers. A tunnel carries some of the water from the Derwent Valley eastwards through the hill and into the lower of the two Rivelin Dams to supply Sheffield.

== Flooded villages ==
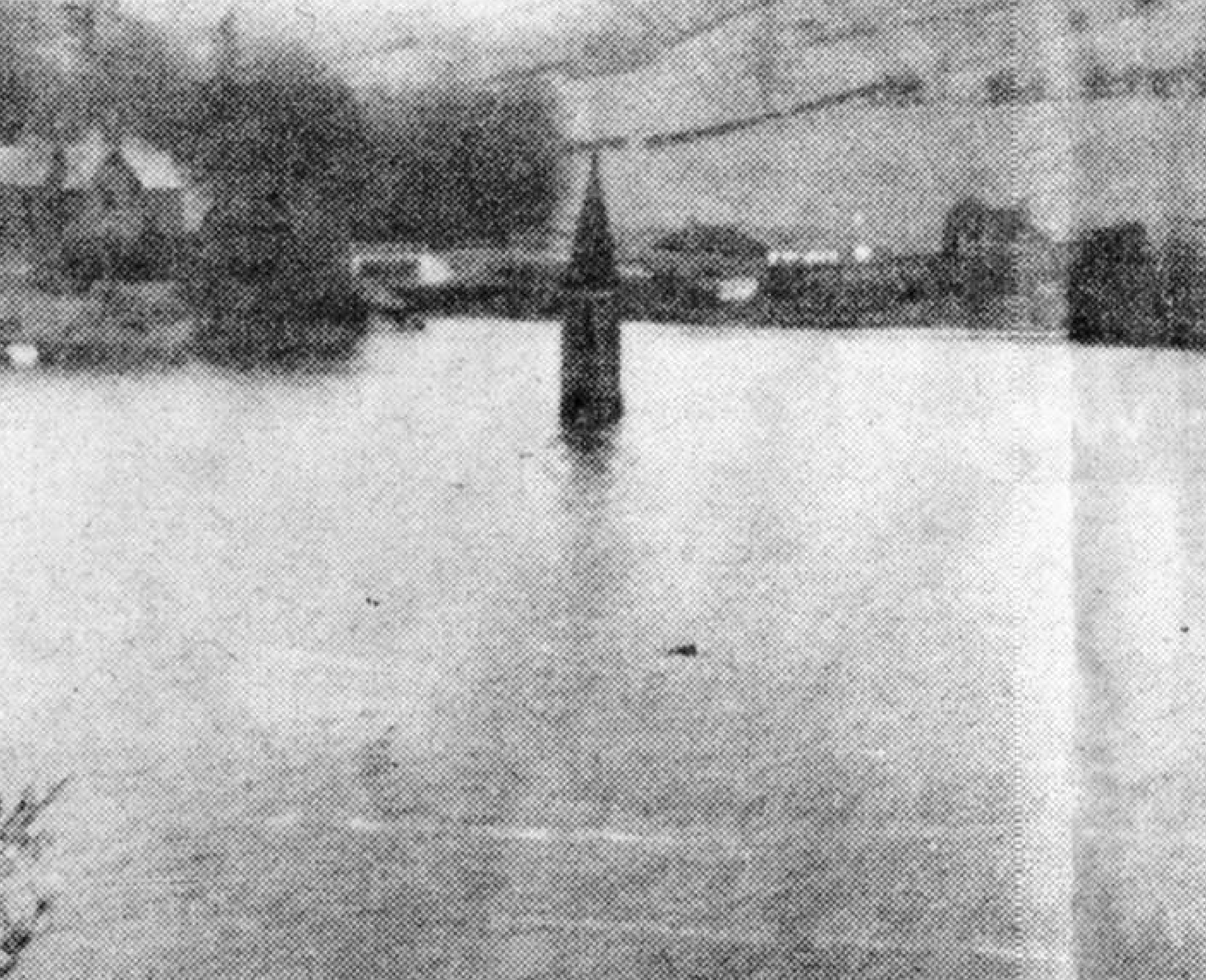
The church tower of Derwent slowly disappearing below the water as the reservoir was filled in 1946

The building of the reservoir resulted in the submersion of the villages of Ashopton and Derwent, including Derwent Woodlands church and Derwent Hall. Ashopton stood roughly where the road to the Snake Pass met the Snake valley. The buildings in Ashopton were demolished before the reservoir was filled, but much of the structure of Derwent village was still visible during a dry summer some 14 years later. Derwent Bridge, a narrow stone packhorse bridge, over the Derwent was removed and rebuilt at the head of the Howden reservoir. The clock tower of the church had been left standing and the upper part of it was visible above the water level until 1947, when it was seen as a hazard and demolished with explosives on 15 December.

In 1976, 1995, 2018, and 2022 dry conditions caused the water level to drop and the village of Derwent to be exposed once again. In 2018, this caused unprecedented crowds to visit the rarely visible site. On 3 November 2018, a man had to be rescued by a mountain rescue team after getting stuck in extremely thick mud around the ruins of the village. On 17 November 2018 it was reported that the site had been vandalised by some of those visiting, with park rangers forced to stop visitors removing items from the site and with graffiti scrawled on some buildings.

== Potential expansion ==
In Autumn 2022 Severn Trent Water announced that it was considering expanding the Ladybower, Howden, and Derwent reservoirs, or building a new reservoir in the area. There was immediate opposition to these plans, due to the potential for environmental damage to the landscape, including the loss of ancient forests.

In June 2023, the water company announced that the potential expansion would not be going ahead. They said that in response to consultation feedback the Upper Derwent Valley Reservoir Expansion scheme had been removed from their preferred plan. The scheme would be replaced by a 'combination of leakage, customer demand management and accelerated supply options'.

== Gallery ==
Around Ladybower Reservoir
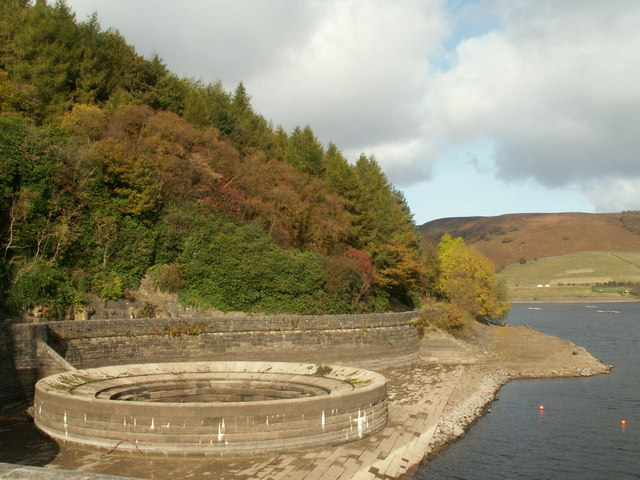
Ladybower Reservoir high and dry

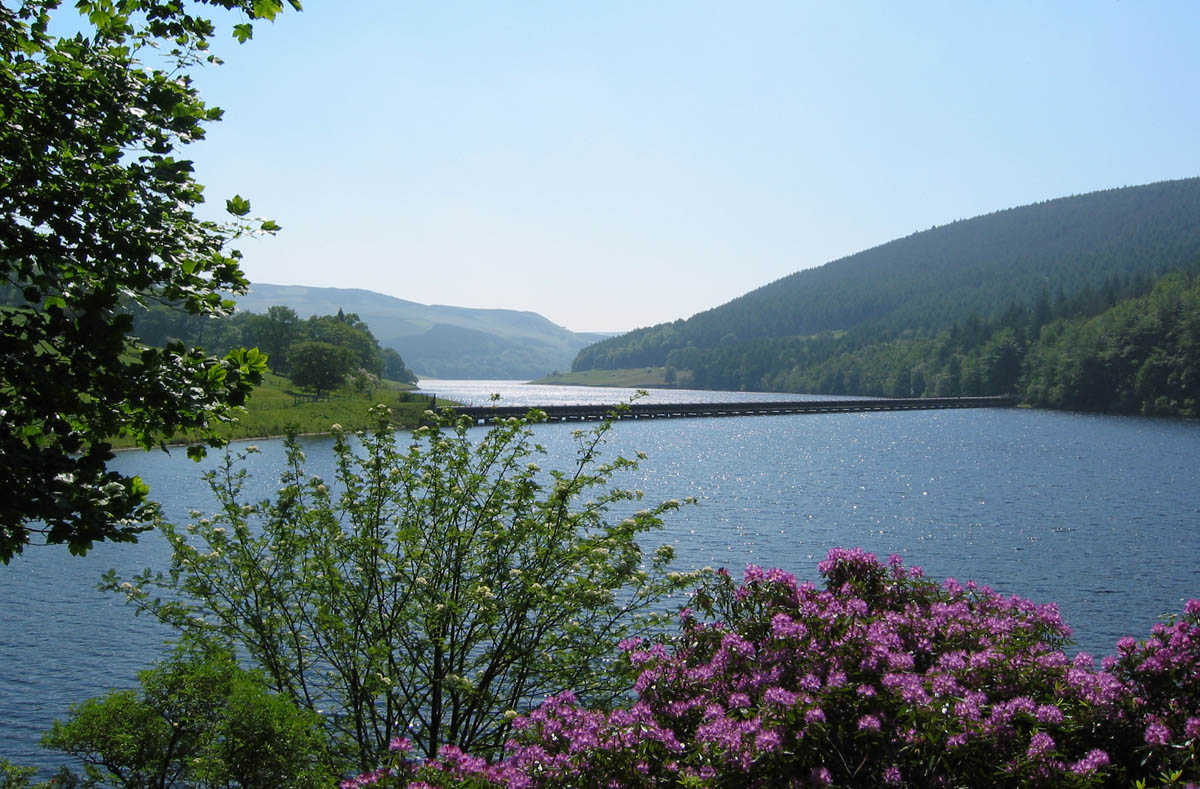
Northern branch of the Ladybower Reservoir, showing aqueduct

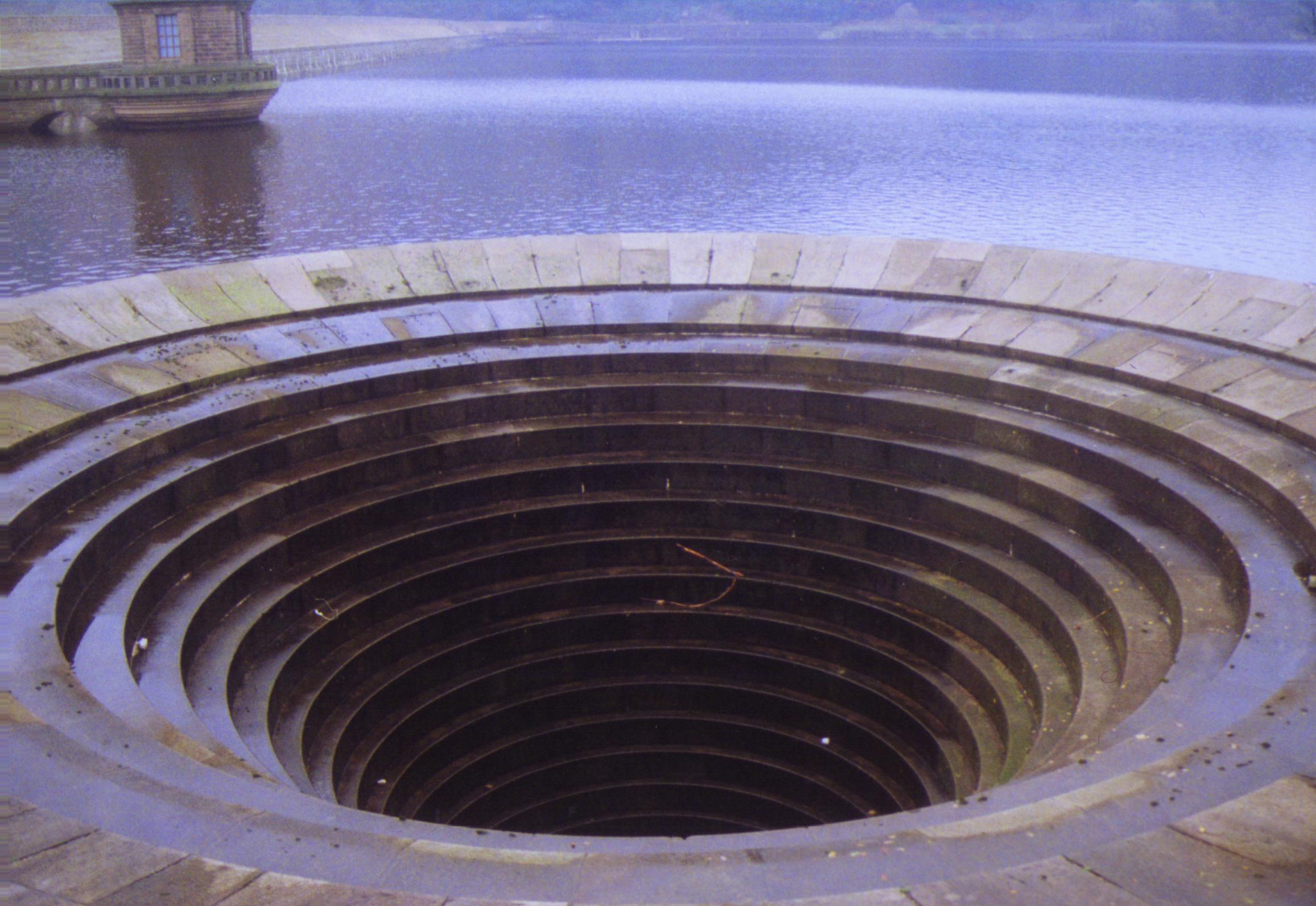
Overflow for the Ladybower Reservoir

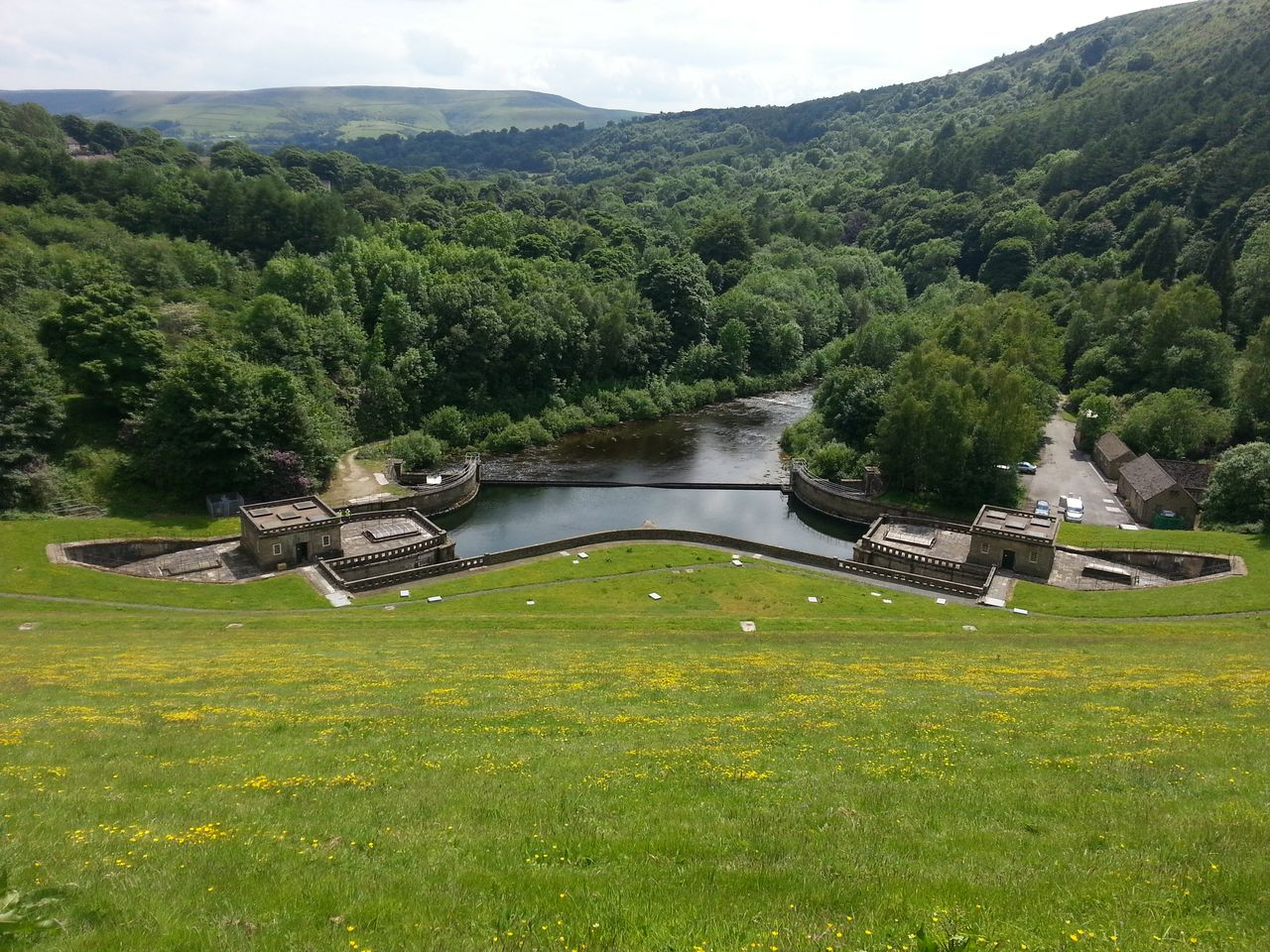
Ladybower Overflow valve-houses

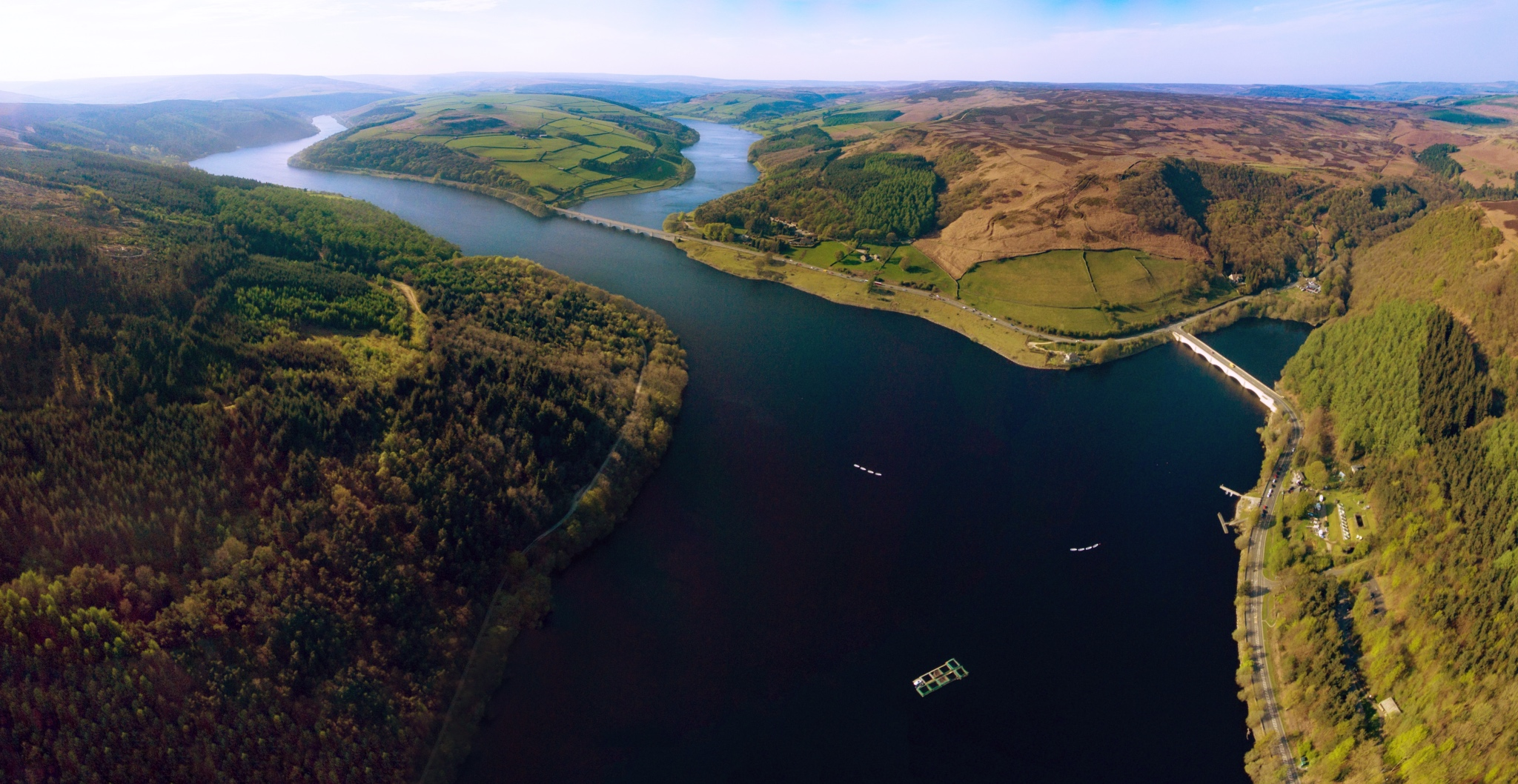
Layout of the Ladybower Reservoir

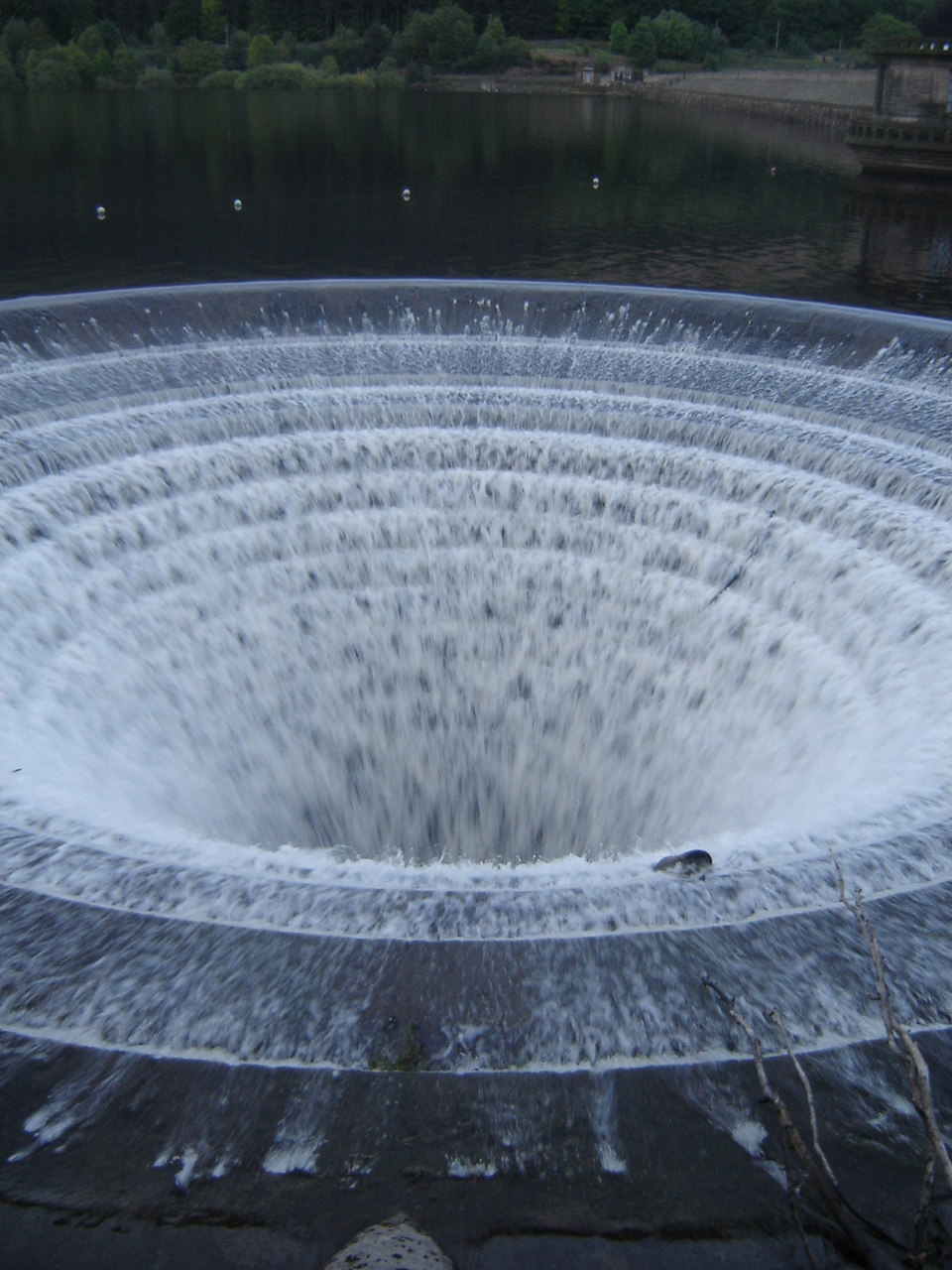
Overflow for the Ladybower Reservoir in full flow, May 2006

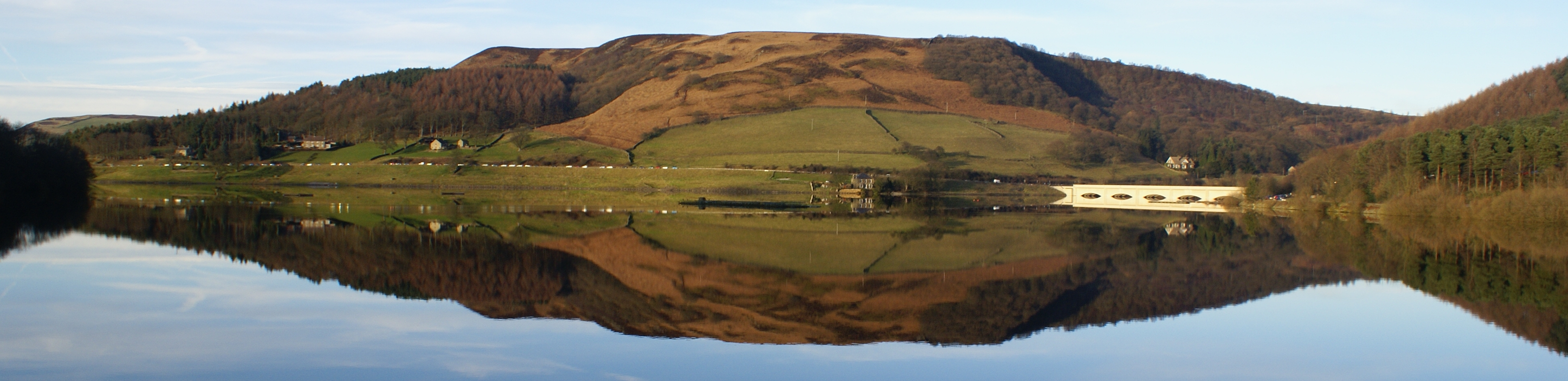
View from the Ladybower Wall across the water

== See also ==
- List of crossings of the River Derwent, Derbyshire
- Listed buildings in Derwent, Derbyshire
