= Bamford =

Village in Derbyshire, England

Coordinates: 53.3485°N 1.6894°W

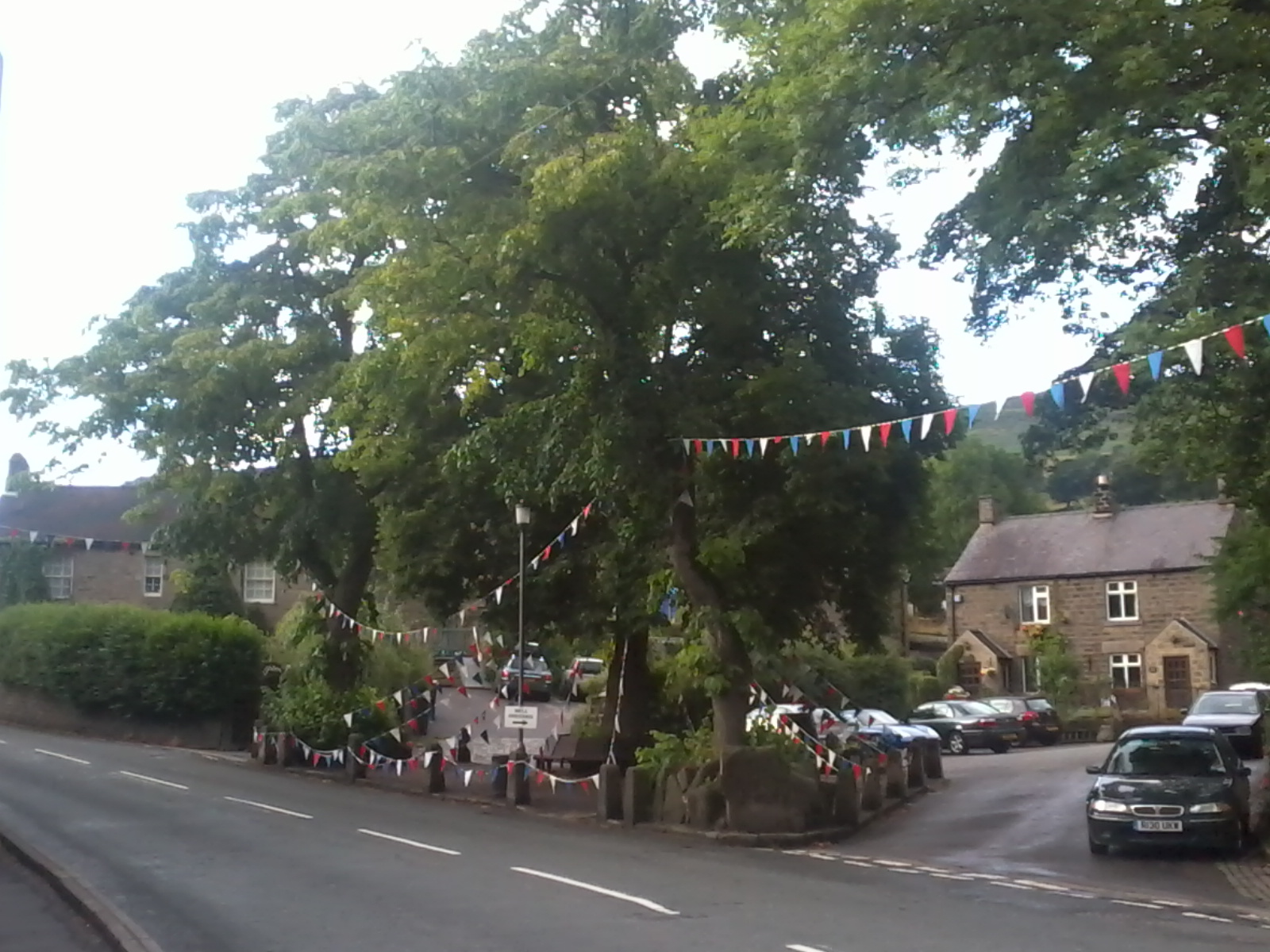
- Bamford green during carnival

- Bamford parish highlighted within Derbyshire
- Population: 1,115
- OS grid reference: SK207835
- District: High Peak
- Shire county: Derbyshire
- Region: East Midlands
- Country: England
- Sovereign state: United Kingdom
- Post town: HOPE VALLEY
- Postcode district: S33
- Dialling code: 01433
- Police: Derbyshire
- Fire: Derbyshire
- Ambulance: East Midlands
- UK Parliament: High Peak

Bamford is a village in the Peak District, Derbyshire, England, close to the River Derwent. To the north-east is Bamford Edge, and to the north-west the Ladybower, Derwent and Howden Reservoirs. At the 2021 census, it had a population of 1,115.

== History ==
Its name is recorded in the Domesday Book as Banford, and likely came from Anglo-Saxon Bēamford = "tree-trunk ford".

The parish church of St John the Baptist was built c. 1860. There is also the Bamford Methodist Church and Catholic churches in the village, most notable of which is Our Lady of Sorrows Church.

The village graveyard also contains some re-interred graves from the nearby villages of Derwent and Ashopton which were submerged following the creation of Ladybower Reservoir.

Bamford watermill has been turned into flats but some of the original machinery still remains.

== Recreation ==
The village has a sculpture trail and, in mid-July, there is a well dressing festival. Bamford has four public houses, the Derwent Hotel (now a self-catering venue), the Anglers Rest, the Ladybower Inn and the Yorkshire Bridge Inn, the latter once home to former Blue Peter presenter Peter Purves. The village also had a weekly Youth Club held in the Memorial Hall until September 2010.

In October 2013 The Anglers Rest was jointly purchased from the pub chain owners Admiral Taverns by over 300 people from the local area as Derbyshire's first community-owned pub. The Bamford Community Society raised the money needed to buy the Angler's, which is listed as an Asset of Community Value under the Government's Localism Act, which also offers a daytime café and houses the local post office.

Nearby Hope Valley College offers yoga classes at Bamford Village Institute as part of its adult education programme.

=== Carnival ===
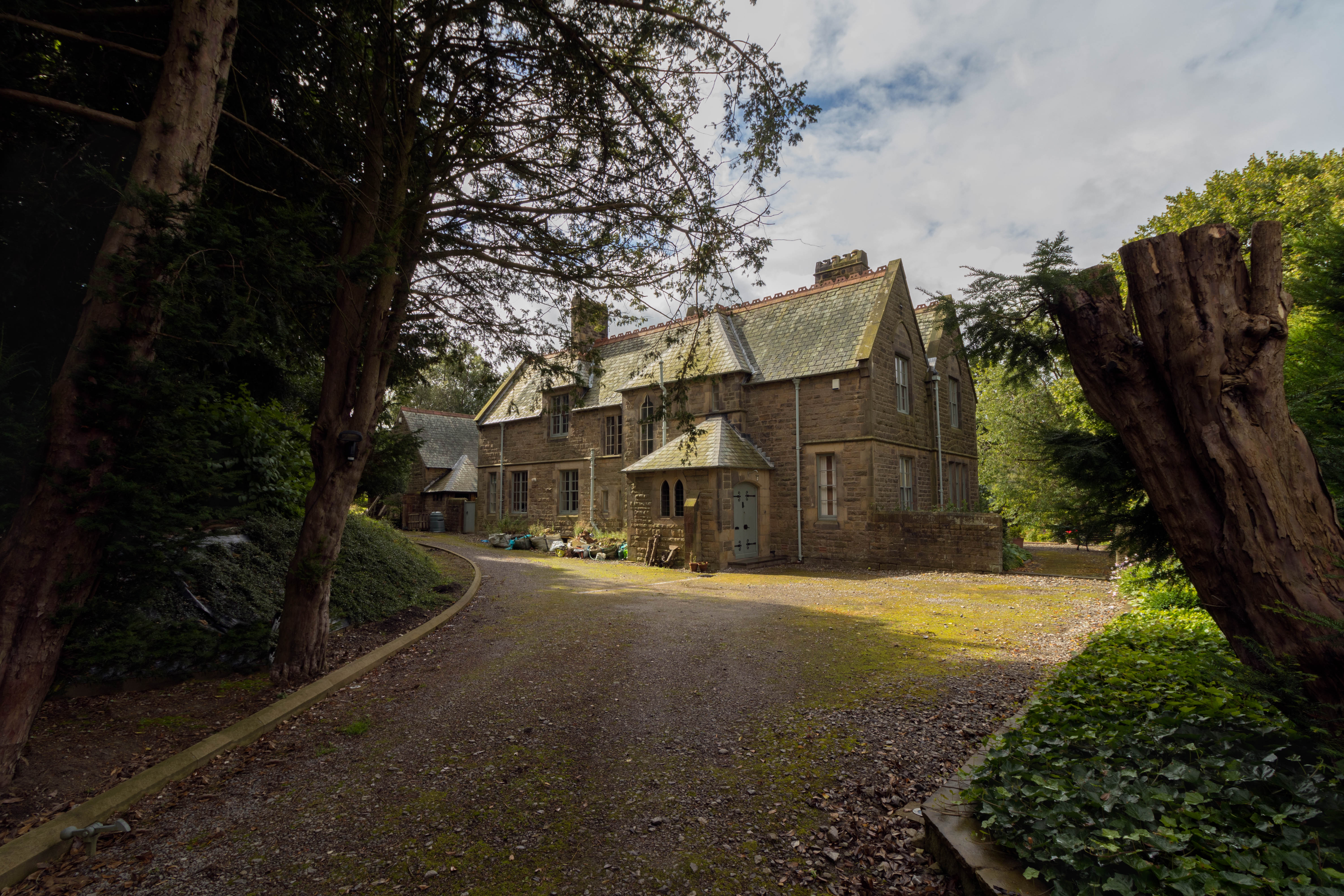
Bamford Rectory (a listed building)

Bamford hosts a village carnival, normally on the third week of July. The carnival takes place throughout the week, with the Committee arranging various events for each day, including the whole family. The carnival includes the well dressing and the Senior fell race which many runners attend, including running groups from Yorkshire. Other events include the junior fell race. The Saturday is the actual carnival day, with the procession travelling from "the old road" and through the village, ending at the recreation ground, where games and entertainment for the whole family are arranged. The carnival parade encourages children to dress up and floats to be made, fitting with the theme of the year. There is also a tradition of making dressed-up scarecrows and leaving them in front gardens to be admired during the carnival.

== Transport ==
The village is served by Bamford railway station on the Hope Valley Line and by regular bus service 257 to Sheffield and Bakewell.

Bamford is known as the Gateway to the Hope Valley from Manchester and the north-west as it provides the only road through to the Hope Valley from the A57 Glossop–Sheffield road over the Snake Pass.

== Media ==
Regional TV news comes from Leeds-based BBC Yorkshire and ITV Yorkshire. Television signals are received from the Shatton Edge relay transmitter. The village is served by both BBC Radio Derby and BBC Radio Sheffield. Another radio station that broadcasts to Bamford is Greatest Hits Radio Derbyshire (High Peak) (formerly High Peak Radio). Bamford's local newspaper is the Derbyshire Times.

== Bamford Mill ==
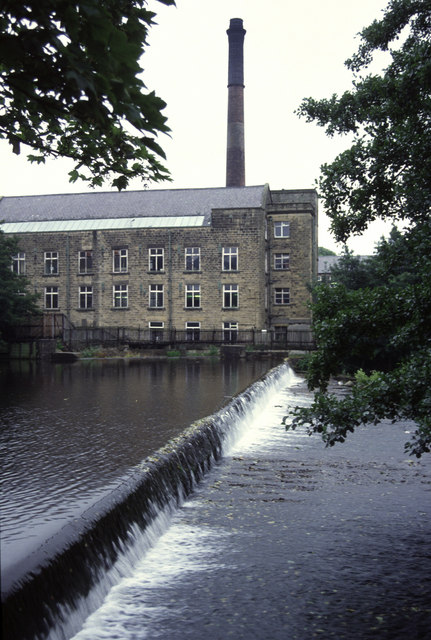
The mill, and chimney, in 1992

As for so many Peak District villages, it developed around its mill, which existed here before the Industrial Revolution. From 1782, a water powered corn mill was built here by a local farmer and miller, Christopher Kirk. This only lasted a few years until destroyed by fire in 1791. It was rebuilt as a cotton mill, still powered by water. In the early 19th century it converted to steam power, with a 60 horsepower (45 kW) beam engine. A more modern horizontal cross-compound mill engine with a rope drive, Edna, by Musgrave was installed in 1907, and remains on site today. Water power was still used for generating electricity for this isolated mill, with two reaction turbines of 45 hp (34 kW) and 22 hp (16 kW). Until 1951 the mill also maintained its own gasworks. More electricity generating capacity was provided by a DC generator driven by a De Laval impulse turbine and reduction gearbox, built by Greenwood & Batley.

In 1857, the mill was owned by S. M. Moore and Son and employed 230 mill hands. It was sold in 1885 to Hamilton Cash of Mansfield, then in 1902 to the Fine Cotton Spinners and Doublers Association. The work at this mill was the doubling of cotton yarn which had already been carded and spun in Lancashire mills. This employed 130 hands. In 1963 FS&D became part of Courtaulds, who closed the mill in 1965. Afterwards the mill building was bought by Carbolite, who manufactured electric kilns and laboratory furnaces.

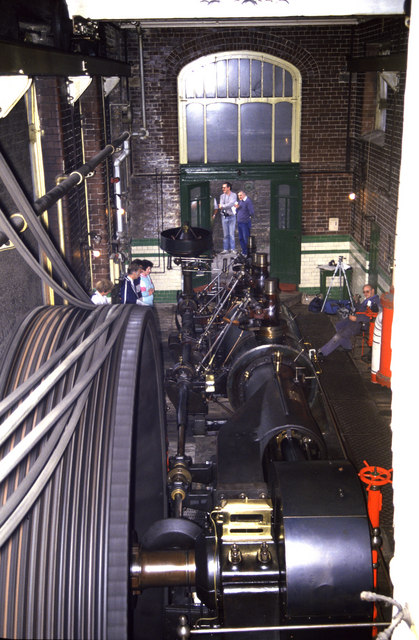
The mill engine running during a public open day in 1986

The mill closed permanently in the 1990s and the building was later converted to flats. The chimney was demolished and the boiler plant and turbines removed. The mill engine was preserved on site and remains there today, but is not operational. Every year locals gather to celebrate the mill and how it brought life to the village.

== Surroundings ==
Further up the valley are the Ladybower, Derwent and Howden dams.

Nearby are the villages of Shatton, Bradwell (well known for its ice cream), Hope, Hathersage (well known for its open air swimming pool), Eyam and Castleton, famous for its Blue John stone. A place of notable significance near Bamford would be Buxton.

The nearest urban centre is Sheffield and is a very popular place to visit for the youth of Bamford and well as Chesterfield which is where many students go for higher education.

Film of Bamford in 1945 is held by the Cinema Museum in London. Ref HM0365

== See also ==
- Listed buildings in Bamford
