= St Michael the Archangel Roman Catholic Church, Hathersage =

Catholic church in Derbyshire

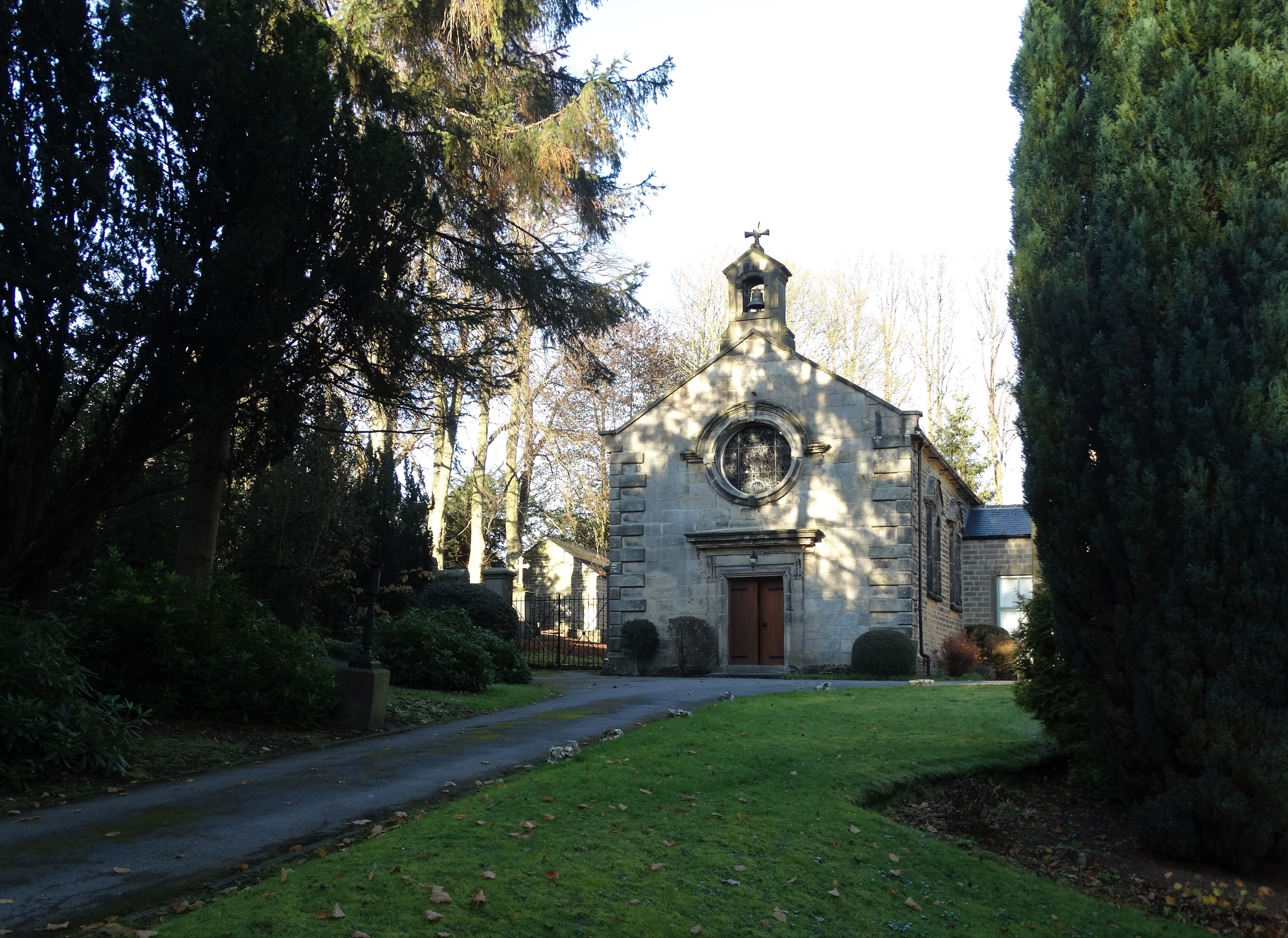
- SSt Michael the Archangel Roman Catholic Church, Hathersage
- St Michael the Archangel Roman Catholic Church, Hathersage
- 53°19′50.9″N 1°39′24.4″W
- OS grid reference: SK 22942 81568
- Location: Hathersage, Derbyshire
- Country: England
- Denomination: Catholic Church

History
- Dedication: St Michael the Archangel

Architecture
- Heritage designation: Grade II* listed

Administration
- Diocese: Roman Catholic Diocese of Hallam

St Michael the Archangel Roman Catholic Church, Hathersage is a Grade II* listed Roman Catholic church in Hathersage, Derbyshire.

As recorded through official records the building dates back to the early 18th Century and became Grade II* listed on 12 July 1967.

== See also ==
- Listed buildings in Hathersage
