= Carding =

Process that disentangles, cleans and intermixes fibres

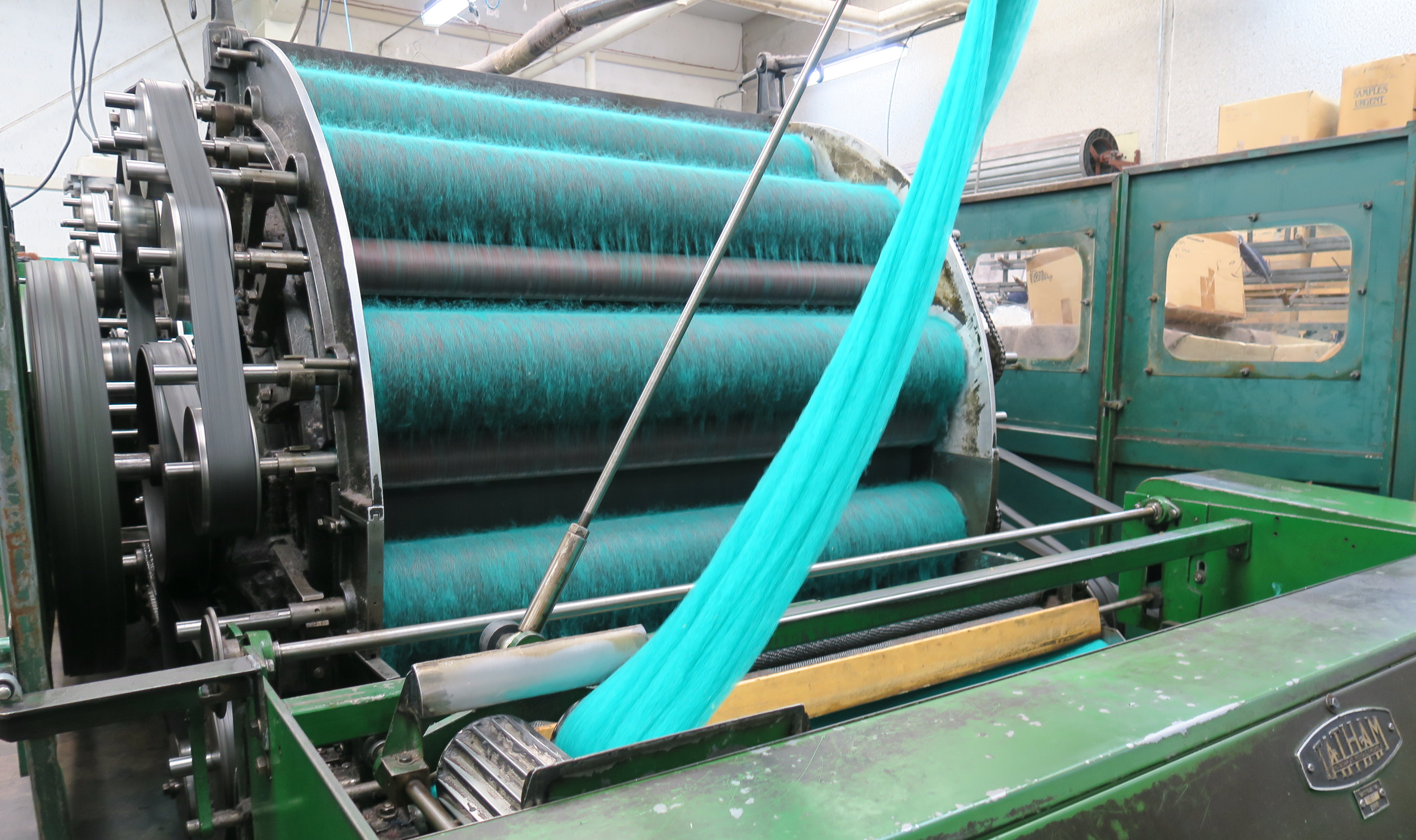
Dyed wool being carded with a 1949 Tatham carding machine at Jamieson Mill, Sandness, Shetland, Scotland

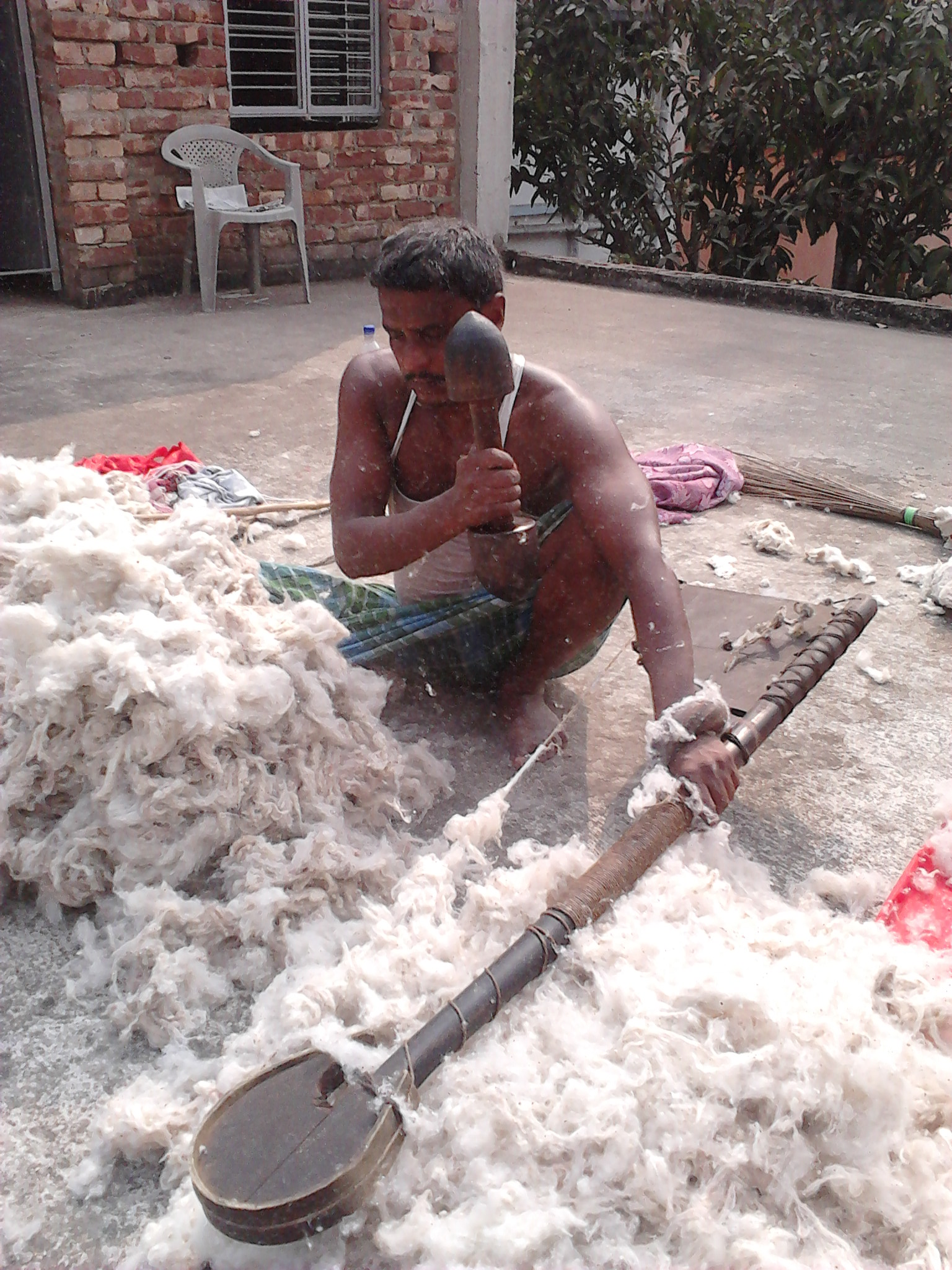
Cotton carder (known as dhunuri or lep wallah) in Howrah, Kolkata, India

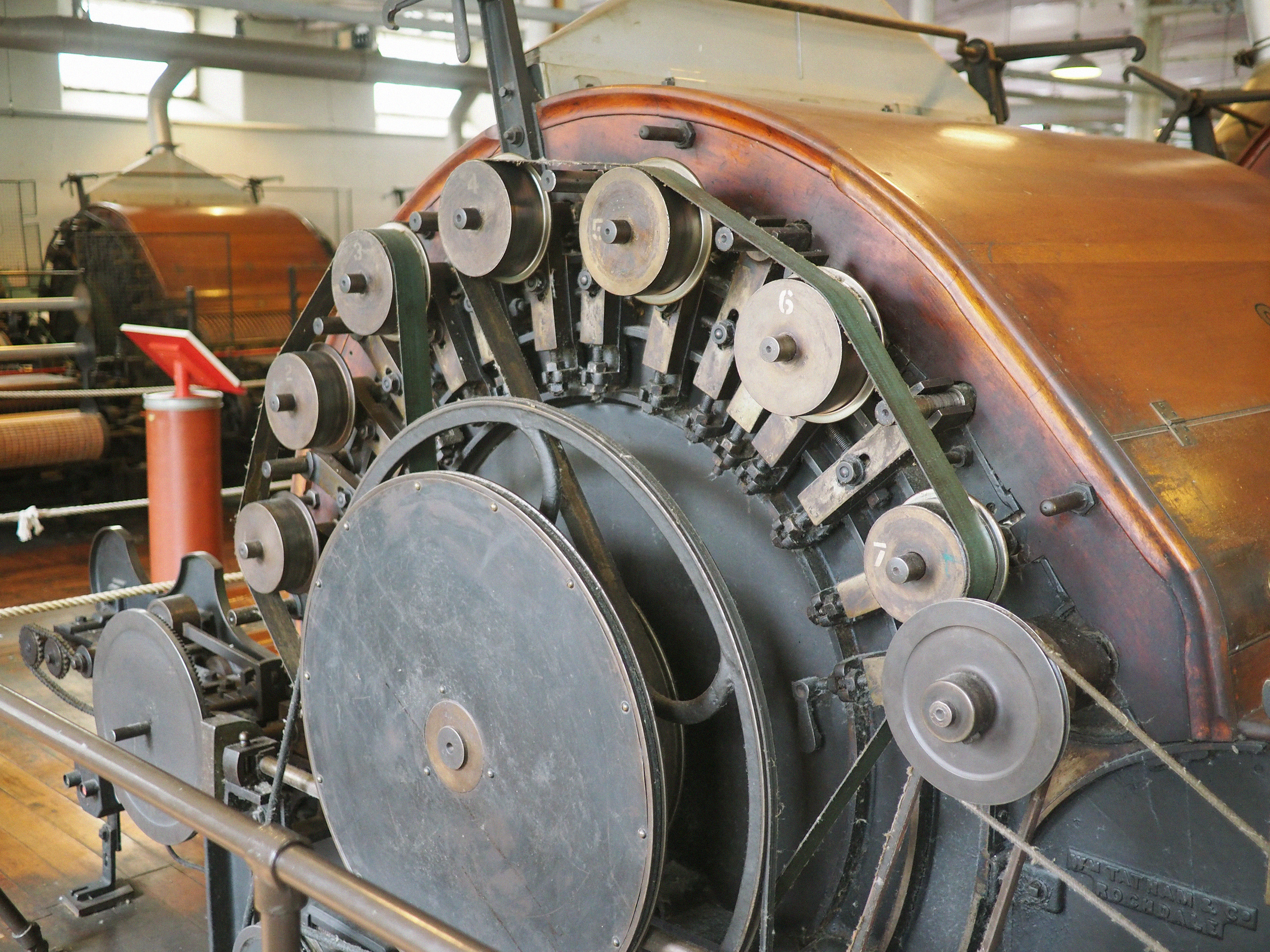
William Tatham Breaker carder.

In textile production, carding is a mechanical process that disentangles, cleans and intermixes fibres to produce a continuous web or sliver suitable for subsequent processing. This is achieved by passing the fibres between differentially moving surfaces covered with "card clothing", a firm flexible material embedded with metal pins. It breaks up locks and unorganised clumps of fibre and then aligns the individual fibres to be parallel with each other. In preparing wool fibre for spinning, carding is the step that comes after teasing.

The word is derived from the Latin carduus meaning thistle or teasel, as dried vegetable teasels were first used to comb the raw wool before technological advances led to the use of machines.

== Overview ==
The ordered fibres can then be passed on after carding to other processes that are specific to the desired end use of the fibre: cotton, batting, felt, woollen or worsted yarn, etc. Carding can also be used to create blends of different fibres or different colours. When blending, the carding process combines the different fibres into a homogeneous mix. Commercial cards also have rollers and systems designed to remove some vegetable matter contaminants from the wool.

Common to all carders is card clothing. Card clothing is made from a sturdy flexible backing in which closely spaced wire pins are embedded. The shape, length, diameter, and spacing of these wire pins are dictated by the card designer and the particular requirements of the application where the card cloth will be used. A later version of the card clothing product developed during the latter half of the 19th century and was found only on commercial carding machines, whereby a single piece of serrated wire was wrapped around a roller, became known as metallic card clothing.

Carding machines are known as cards. Fibre may be carded by hand for hand spinning.

== History ==
Science historian Joseph Needham ascribes the invention of bow-instruments used in textile technology to India. The earliest evidence for using bow-instruments for carding comes from India (2nd century CE). These carding devices, called kaman (bow) and dhunaki, would loosen the texture of the fibre by the means of a vibrating string.

At the turn of the eighteenth century, wool in England was being carded using pairs of hand cards, in a two-stage process: 'working' with the cards opposed and 'stripping' where they are in parallel.

In 1748 Lewis Paul of Birmingham, England, invented two hand driven carding machines. The first used a coat of wires on a flat table moved by foot pedals. This failed. On the second, a coat of wire slips was placed around a card which was then wrapped around a cylinder. Daniel Bourn obtained a similar patent in the same year, and probably used it in his spinning mill at Leominster, but this burnt down in 1754. The invention was later developed and improved by Richard Arkwright and Samuel Crompton. Arkwright's second patent (of 1775) for his carding machine was subsequently declared invalid (1785) because it lacked originality.

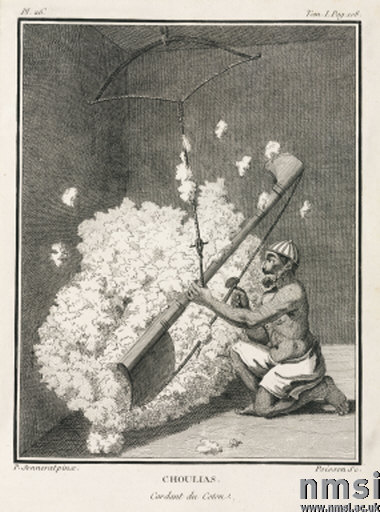
A "cotton carder": engraving copied from artist Pierre Sonnerat's 1782 illustration

From the 1780s, the carding machines were set up in mills in the north of England and mid-Wales. Priority was given to cotton but woollen fibres were being carded in Yorkshire in 1780. With woollen, two carding machines were used: the first or the scribbler opened and mixed the fibres, the second or the condenser mixed and formed the web. The first in Wales was in a factory at Dolobran near Meifod in 1789. These carding mills produced yarn particularly for the Welsh flannel industry.

In 1834 James Walton invented the first practical machines to use a wire card. He patented this machine and also a new form of card with layers of cloth and rubber. The combination of these two inventions became the standard for the carding industry, using machines first built by Parr, Curtis and Walton in Ancoats, and from 1857 by James Walton & Sons at Haughton Dale.

By 1838, the Spen Valley, centred on Cleckheaton, had at least 11 card clothing factories and by 1893, it was generally accepted as the card cloth capital of the world, though by 2008 only two manufacturers of metallic and flexible card clothing remained in England: Garnett Wire Ltd., dating from 1851, and Joseph Sellers & Son Ltd., established in 1840.

Baird from Scotland took carding to Leicester, Massachusetts, in the 1780s. In the 1890s, the town produced one-third of all hand and machine cards in North America. John and Arthur Slater, from Saddleworth went over to work with Slater in 1793.

A 1780s scribbling mill would be driven by a water wheel. There were 170 scribbling mills around Leeds at that time. Each scribbler would require 15–45 horsepower (11–34 kW) to operate. Modern machines are driven by belting from an electric motor or an overhead shaft via two pulleys.

== Cotton manufacturing processes ==
Cotton manufacturing processes
Bale breaker
Willowing
Breaker scutcher	Batting
Finishing scutcher	Lapping
Carding
Sliver lap
Combing
Drawing
Slubbing
Intermediate
Roving	Fine roving
Mule spinning	Ring spinning
Reeling
Winding	Bundling
Weaving shed
Beaming
Warping
Sizing/slashing/dressing
Weaving
Cloth	Yarn (cheese) Bundle

Blowing room
Teasing
Carding room
Spinning
Doubling
Bleaching
Winding
Cabling
Gassing
Spooling
Sewing thread

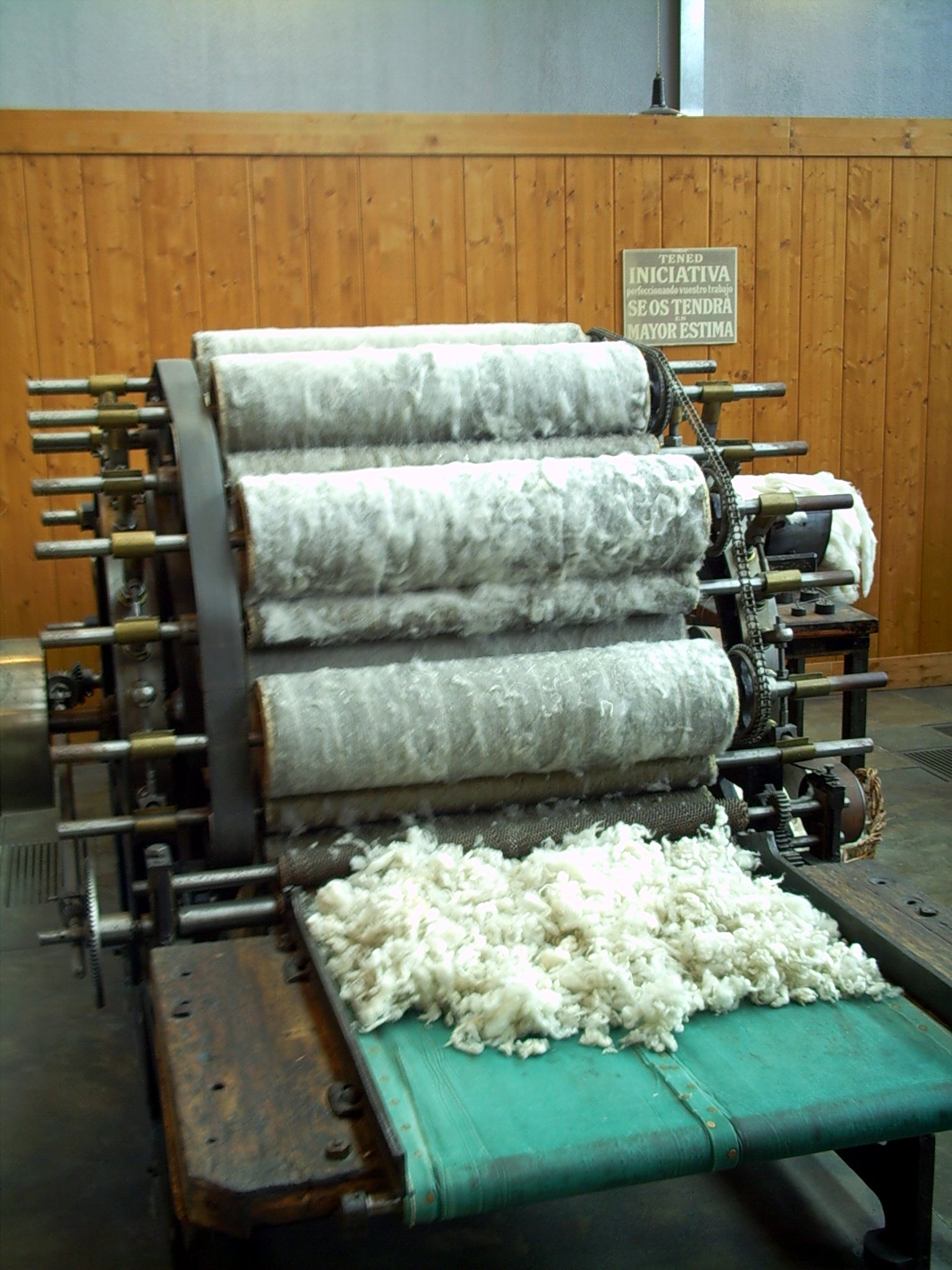
Carding machine

Carding: the fibres are separated and then assembled into a loose strand (sliver or tow) at the conclusion of this stage.

The cotton comes off of the picking machine in laps, and is then taken to carding machines. The carders line up the fibres nicely to make them easier to spin. The carding machine consists mainly of one big roller with smaller ones surrounding it. All of the rollers are covered with small teeth, and as the cotton progresses further on the teeth get finer (i.e. closer together). The cotton leaves the carding machine in the form of a sliver; a large rope of fibres.

In a wider sense carding can refer to the four processes of willowing, lapping, carding and drawing. In willowing the fibres are loosened. In lapping the dust is removed to create a flat sheet or lap of fibres; Carding itself is the combing of the tangled lap into a thick rope or sliver of 1/2 inch in diameter, it can then be optionally combed, is used to remove the shorter fibres, creating a stronger yarn.

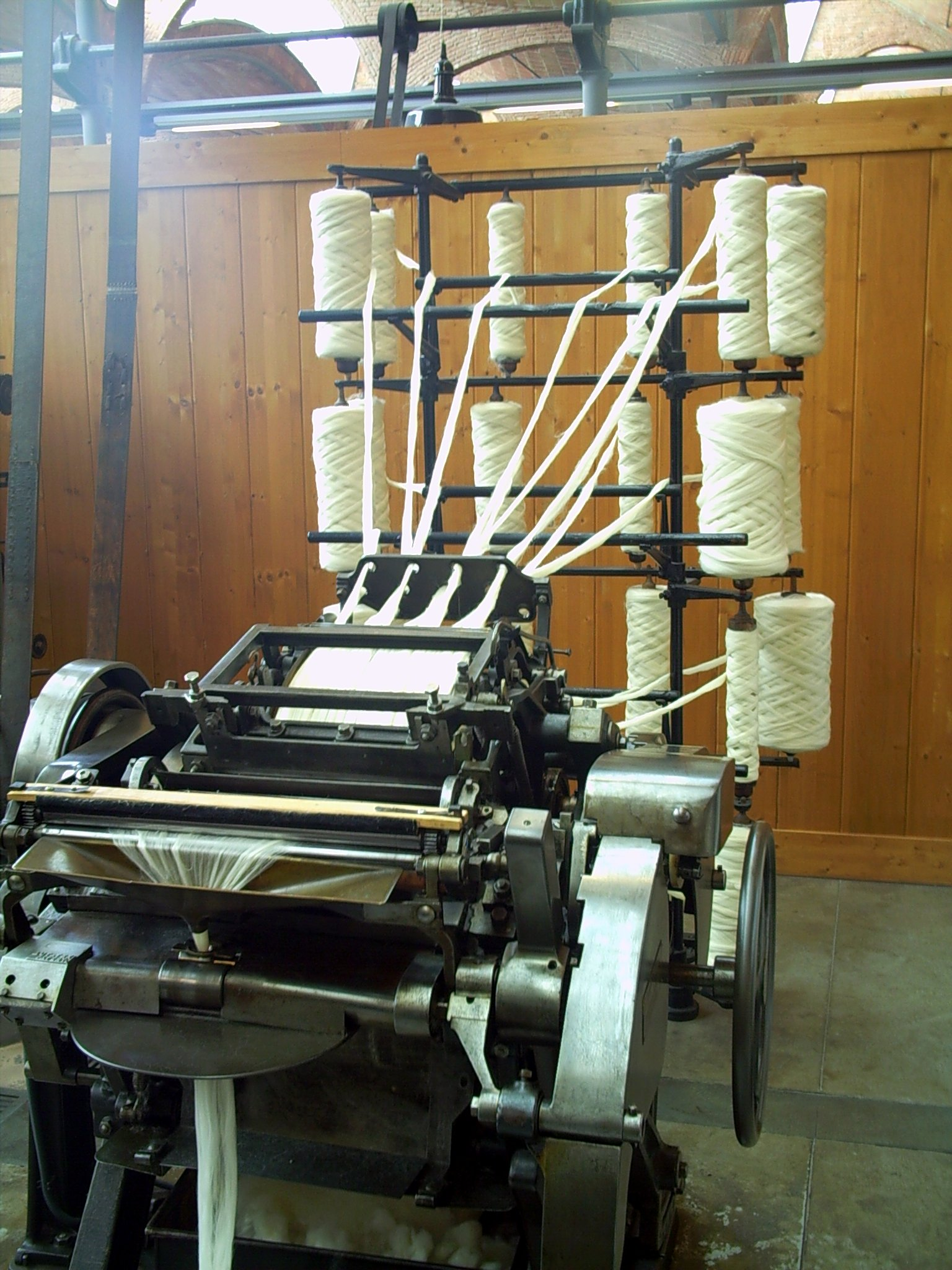
A combing machine

In drawing a drawing frame combines 4 slivers into one. Repeated drawing increases the quality of the sliver allowing for finer counts to be spun. Each sliver will have thin and thick spots, and by combining several slivers together a more consistent size can be reached. Since combining several slivers produces a very thick rope of cotton fibres, directly after being combined the slivers are separated into rovings. These rovings (or slubbings) are then what are used in the spinning process.

For machine processing, a roving is about the width of a pencil. The rovings are collected in a drum and proceed to the slubbing frame which adds twist, and winds onto bobbins. Intermediate Frames are used to repeat the slubbing process to produce a finer yarn, and then the roving frames reduces it to a finer thread, gives more twist, makes more regular and even in thickness, and winds onto a smaller tube.

The carders used currently in woollen mills differ very little from machines used 20 to 50 years ago, and in some cases, the machines are from that era.

Machine carders vary in size from the one that easily fits on the kitchen table, to the carder that takes up a full room.

A carder that takes up a full room works very similarly, the main difference being that the fibre goes through many more drums often with intervening cross laying to even out the load on the subsequent cards, which normally get finer as the fibre progresses through the system.

When the fibre comes off the drum, it is in the form of a bat – a flat, orderly mass of fibres. If a small drum carder is being used, the bat is the length of the circumference of the big drum and is often the finished product. A big drum carder, though, will then take that bat and turn it into roving, by stretching it thinner and thinner, until it is the desired thickness (often rovings are the thickness of a wrist). (A rolag differs from a roving because it is not a continuous strand, and because the fibres end up going across instead of along the strand.) Cotton fibres are fed into the machine, picked up and brushed onto flats when carded.

Some hand-spinners have a small drum carder at home especially for the purpose of mixing together the different coloured fibre that are bought already carded.

Historical carding machines

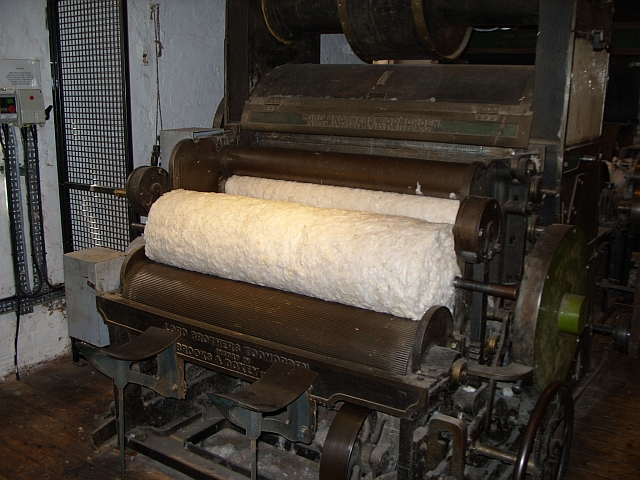
A restored carding machine at Quarry Bank Mill, Styal, Cheshire

A wool carder from 1913 at the Müller Cloth Mill, Euskirchen, North Rhine-Westphalia

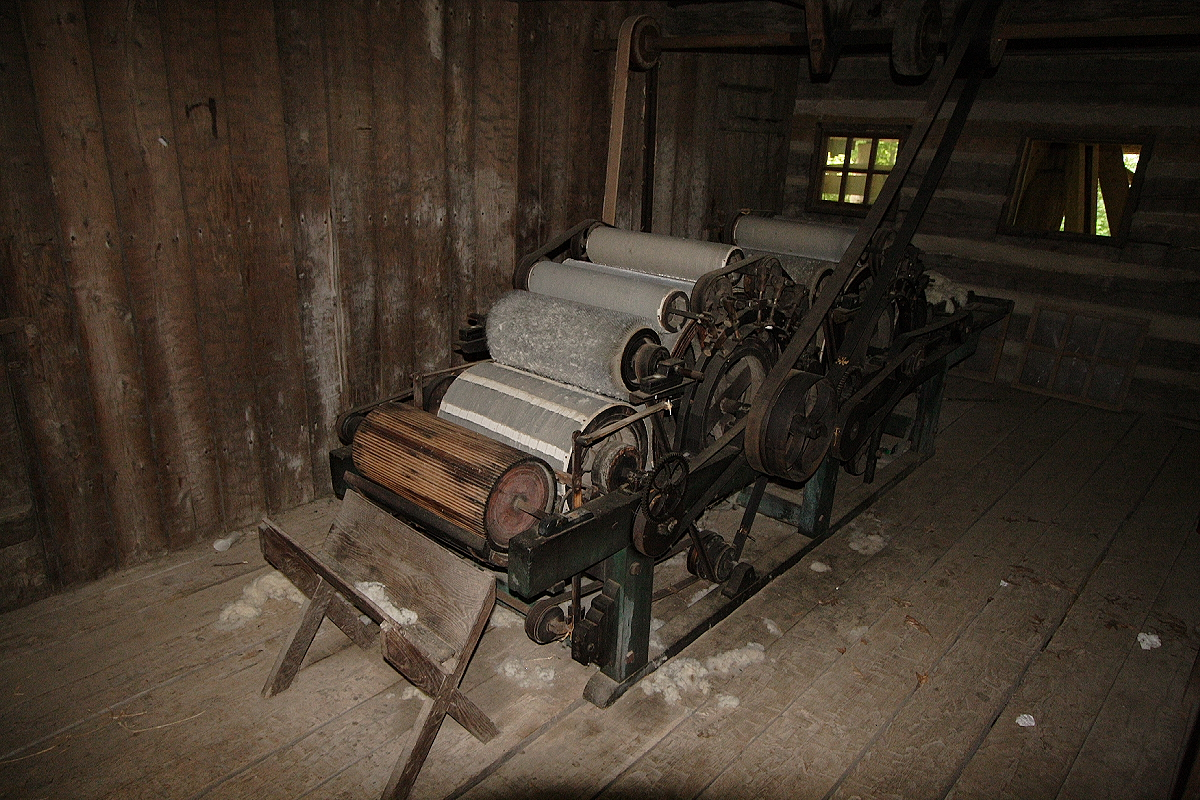
19th-century ox-powered double carding machine

== Tools ==
Predating mechanised weaving, hand loom weaving was a cottage industry that used the same processes but on a smaller scale. These skills have survived as an artisan craft or as an art form and hobby.

=== Hand carders ===
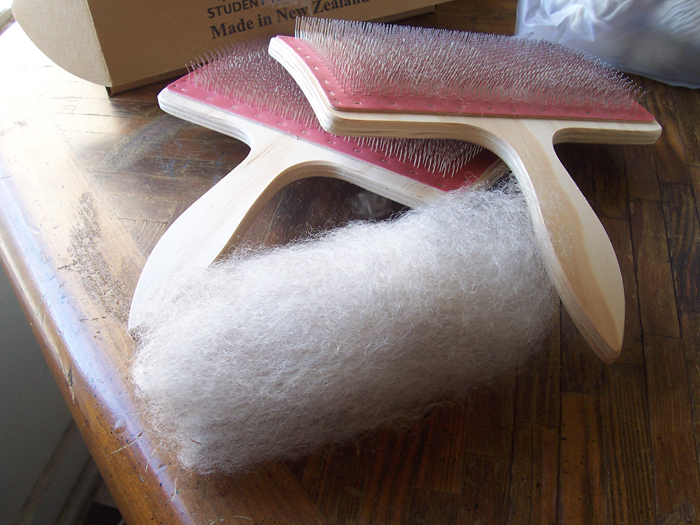
Creating a rolag using hand cards

Irreler Bauerntradition shows carding, spinning and knitting in the Roscheider Hof Open Air Museum

Hand cards are typically square or rectangular paddles manufactured in a variety of sizes from 2 by 2 inches (5.1 cm × 5.1 cm) to 4 by 8 inches (10 cm × 20 cm). The working face of each paddle can be flat or cylindrically curved and wears the card cloth. Small cards, called flick cards, are used to flick the ends of a lock of fibre, or to tease out some strands for spinning off.

A pair of cards is used to brush the wool between them until the fibres are more or less aligned in the same direction. The aligned fibre is then peeled from the card as a rolag. Carding is an activity normally done outside or over a drop cloth, depending on the wool's cleanliness. Rolag is peeled from the card.

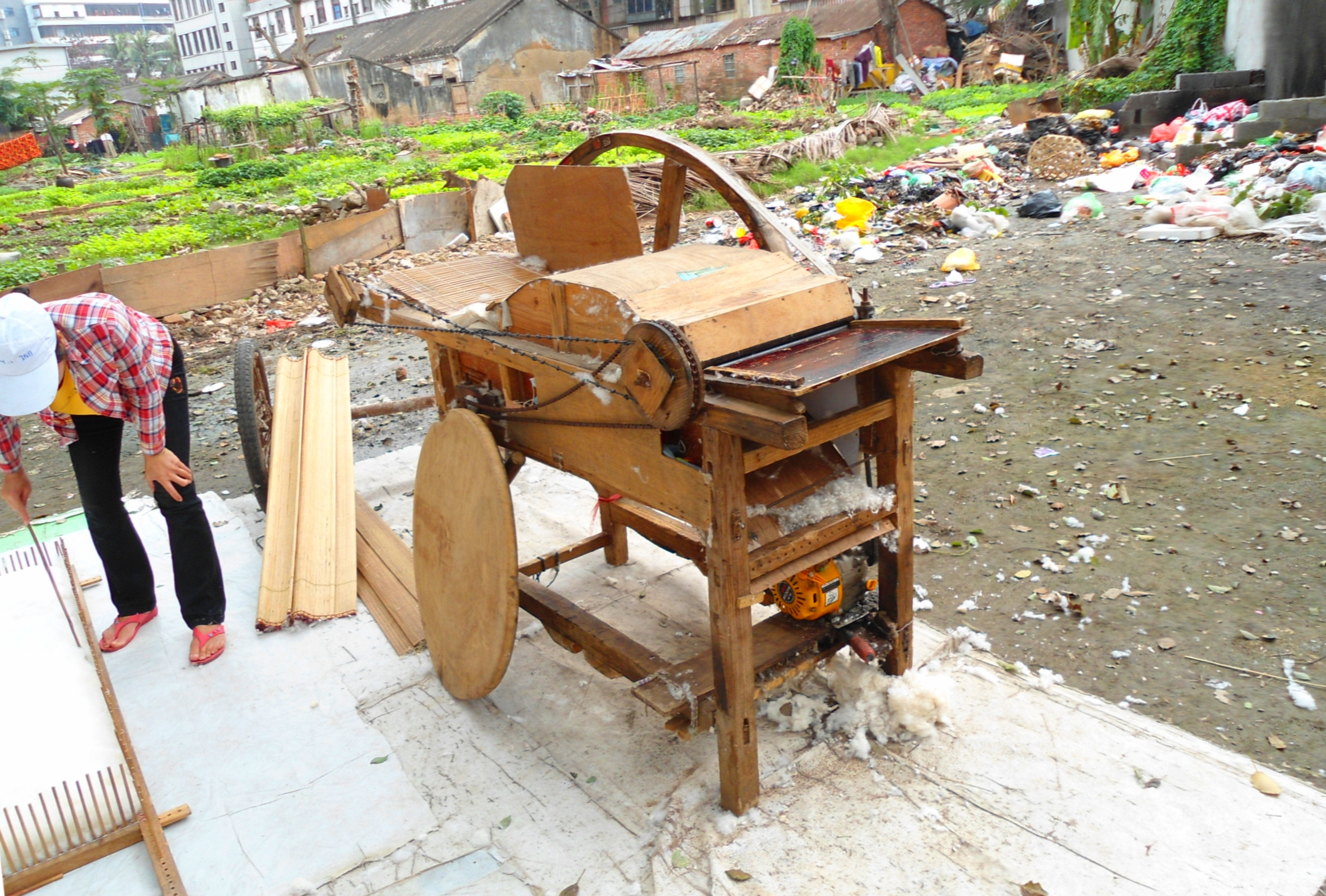
A carding machine in Haikou, Hainan Province, China

This product (rovings, rolags, and batts) can be used for spinning.

Carding of wool can either be done "in the grease" or not, depending on the type of machine and on the spinner's preference. "In the grease" means that the lanolin that naturally comes with the wool has not been washed out, leaving the wool with a slightly greasy feel. The large drum carders do not tend to get along well with lanolin, so most commercial worsted and woollen mills wash the wool before carding. Hand carders (and small drum carders too, though the directions may not recommend it) can be used to card lanolin-rich wool.

=== Drum carders ===
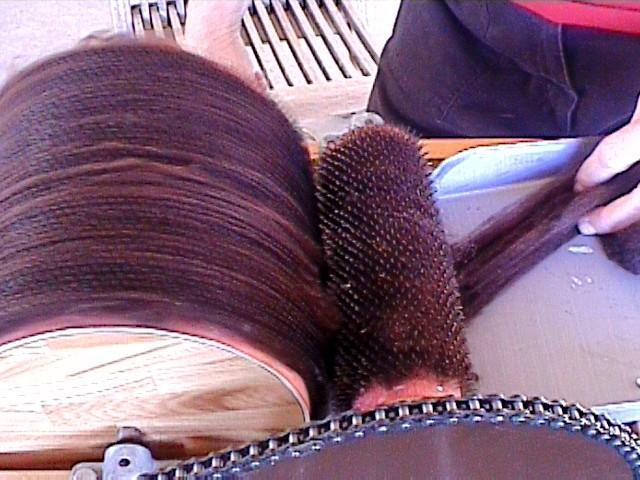
Carding llama hair with a hand-cranked drum carder

The simplest machine carder is the drum carder. Most drum carders are hand-cranked but some are powered by an electric motor. These machines generally have two rollers, or drums, covered with card clothing. The licker-in, or smaller roller meters fibre from the infeed tray onto the larger storage drum. The two rollers are connected to each other by a belt- or chain-drive so that their relative speeds cause the storage drum to gently pull fibres from the licker-in. This pulling straightens the fibres and lays them between the wire pins of the storage drum's card cloth. Fibre is added until the storage drum's card cloth is full. A gap in the card cloth facilitates removal of the batt when the card cloth is full.

Some drum carders have a soft-bristled brush attachment that presses the fibre into the storage drum. This attachment serves to condense the fibres already in the card cloth and adds a small amount of additional straightening to the condensed fibre.

=== Cottage carders ===
Workings of a cottage carder
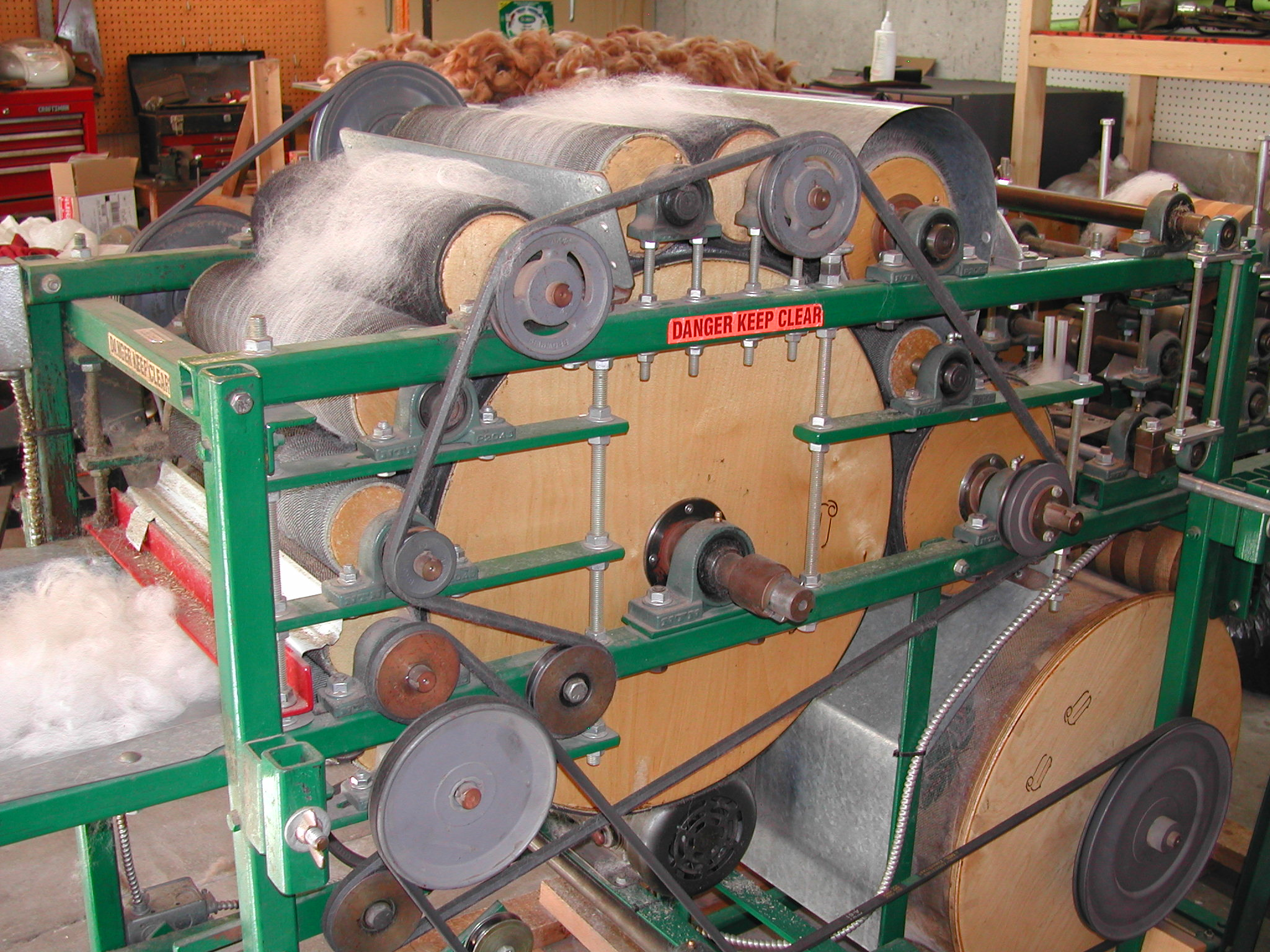
Using a cottage carder to card white alpaca

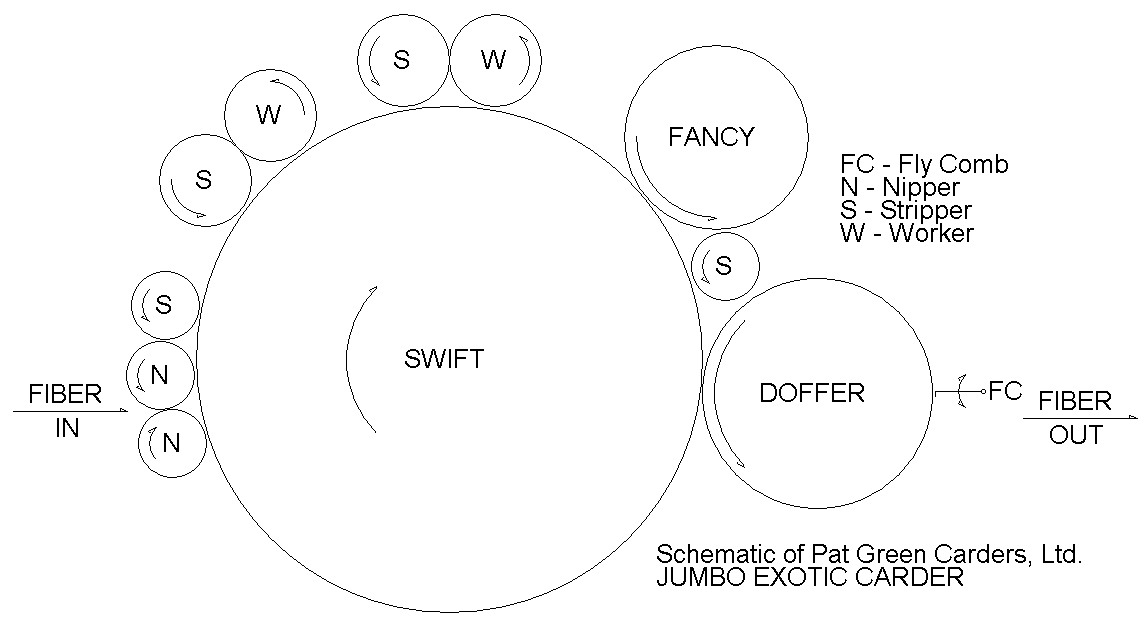
Diagram showing name, location, and rotation of rollers used on a cottage carder

Cottage carding machines differ significantly from the simple drum card. These carders do not store fibre in the card cloth as the drum carder does; rather, fibre passes through the workings of the carder for storage or for additional processing by other machines.

A typical cottage carder has a single large drum (the swift) accompanied by a pair of in-feed rollers (nippers), one or more pairs of worker and stripper rollers, a fancy, and a doffer. In-feed to the carder is usually accomplished by hand or by conveyor belt and often the output of the cottage carder is stored as a batt or further processed into roving and wound into bumps with an accessory bump winder. The cottage carder in the image below supports both outputs.

Raw fibre, placed on the in-feed table or conveyor is moved to the nippers which restrain and meter the fiber onto the swift. As they are transferred to the swift, many of the fibres are straightened and laid into the swift's card cloth. These fibres will be carried past the worker or stripper rollers to the fancy.

As the swift carries the fibres forward, from the nippers, those fibres that are not yet straightened are picked up by a worker and carried over the top to its paired stripper. Relative to the surface speed of the swift, the worker turns quite slowly. This has the effect of reversing the fibre. The stripper, which turns at a higher speed than the worker, pulls fibres from the worker and passes them to the swift. The stripper's relative surface speed is slower than the swift's so the swift pulls the fibres from the stripper for additional straightening.

Straightened fibres are carried by the swift to the fancy. The fancy's card cloth is designed to engage with the swift's card cloth so that the fibres are lifted to the tips of the swift's card cloth and carried by the swift to the doffer. The fancy and the swift are the only rollers in the carding process that actually touch.

The slowly turning doffer removes the fibres from the swift and carries them to the fly comb where they are stripped from the doffer. A fine web of more or less parallel fibre, a few fibres thick and as wide as the carder's rollers, exits the carder at the fly comb by gravity or other mechanical means for storage or further processing.

== See also ==
- Cotton mill
- Cotton-spinning machinery
- Doubling (textiles)
- DREF friction spinning
- Gig-mill
- Open end spinning
- Spinning
- Spinning wheel
- Textile manufacture during the Industrial Revolution
- Textile manufacturing
- Timeline of clothing and textiles technology
- Yarn realisation
- P. & C. Garnett Ltd, 19th-century innovators of metallic carding wire and garnetting.
