= Doubling (textiles) =

Textile process that combines fibers during spinning

Doubling is a textile industry term synonymous with combining. It can be used for various processes during spinning. During the carding stage, several sources of roving are doubled together and drawn, to remove variations in thickness. After spinning, yarn is doubled for many reasons. Yarn may be doubled to produce warp for weaving, to make cotton for lace, crochet and knitting. It is used for embroidery threads and sewing threads, for example: sewing thread is usually 6-cable thread. Two threads of spun 60s cotton are twisted together, and three of these double threads are twisted into a cable, of what is now 5s yarn. This is mercerised, gassed (AKA flamed) and wound onto a bobbin.

== Processing of cotton ==
Cotton manufacturing processes
Bale breaker
Willowing
Breaker scutcher	Batting
Finishing scutcher	Lapping
Carding
Sliver lap
Combing
Drawing
Slubbing
Intermediate
Roving	Fine roving
Mule spinning	Ring spinning
Reeling
Winding	Bundling
Weaving shed
Beaming
Warping
Sizing/slashing/dressing
Weaving
Cloth	Yarn (cheese) Bundle

Blowing room
Teasing
Carding room
Spinning
Doubling
Bleaching
Winding
Cabling
Gassing
Spooling
Sewing thread

=== Doubling in the carding process ===
In a wider sense carding can refer to the four processes of willowing, lapping, carding and drawing. During willowing the fibres are loosened; in lapping the dust is removed to create a flat sheet or lap of fibres. Carding combs the tangled lap into a thick rope or sliver of 1/2 inch in diameter, and removes the shorter fibres creating a stronger yarn.

During the carding process the staples are separated and then assembled into a loose strand (sliver or tow). The carders line up the staples to prepare them for spinning. The carding machine consists mainly of one big roller with smaller ones surrounding it. All of the rollers are covered in small teeth, and as the cotton progresses further on the teeth get finer (i.e. closer together). The cotton leaves the carding machine in the form of a sliver; a large rope of fibres.

In drawing, four slivers are combined into one. Repeated drawing decreases the quality of the sliver drastically, disabling finer counts from being spun. Each sliver will have thin and thick spots. By combining, or doubling several slivers together a more consistent size can be reached. The slivers are separated into rovings. These rovings (or slubbings) are then what are used in the spinning process.

For machine processing, a roving is about the width of a pencil. The rovings are collected in a drum and proceed to the slubbing frame which adds twist, and winds onto bobbins. Intermediate Frames are used to repeat the slubbing process to produce a finer yarn, and then the roving frames reduces it to a finer thread, gives more twist, makes more regular and even in thickness, and winds onto a smaller tube.

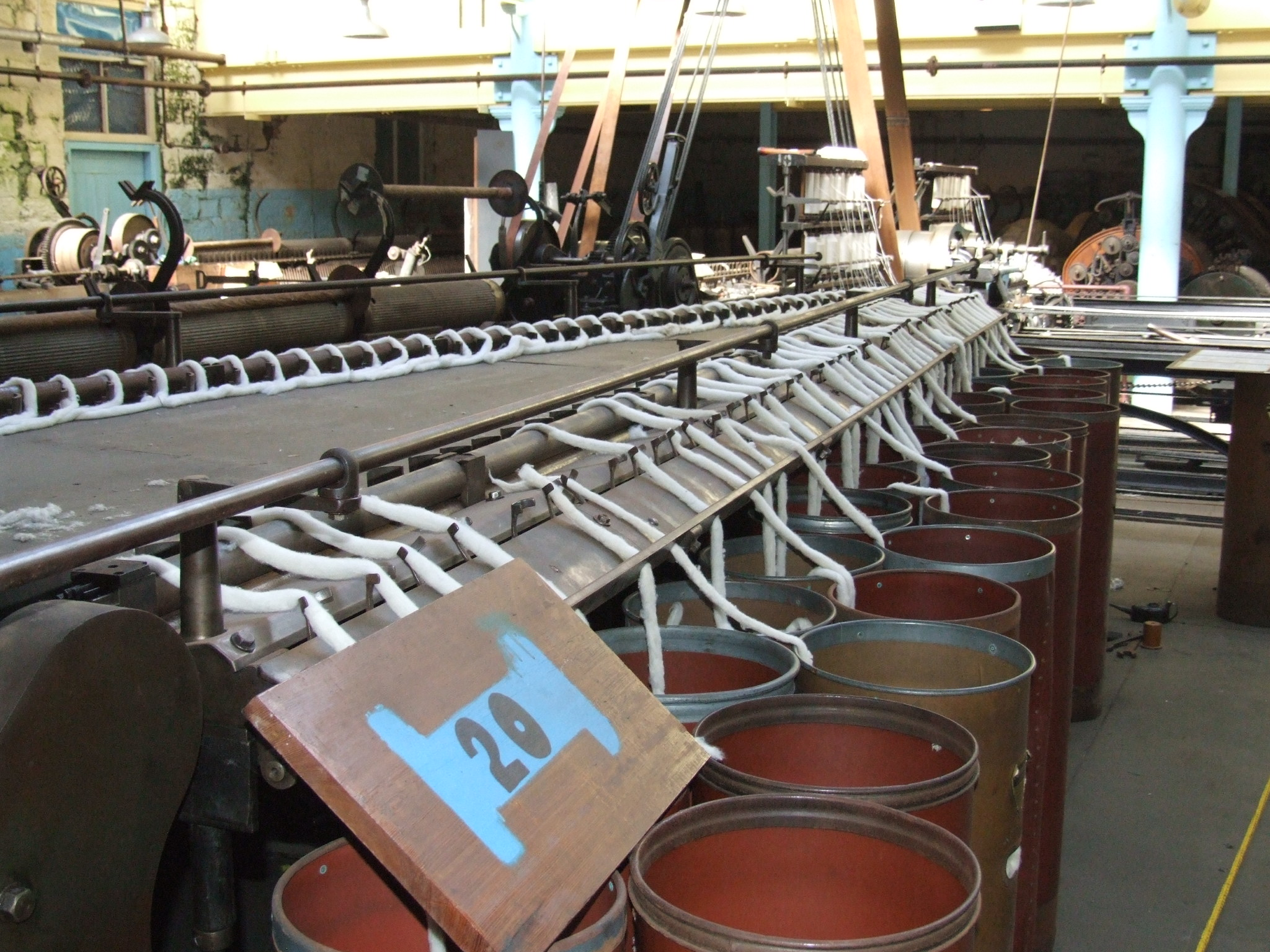
Derby Doubler:Masson Mills

Over time the processes were refined. At Masson Mill and at Helmshore, there are Derby Doublers. The Masson machine, built by Platts of Oldham in 1902, doubled rovings from the breaker cards into card lap. This was then passed through the finisher card to produce the rovings This process was known as double carding. The Derby Doubler was patented by Evan Leigh of Ashton-under-Lyne (21 December 1810 – 2 February 1876) and, though superseded, still continued in service in condensing coarse counts.

=== The doubling process ===
Doubling of yarn where two or more strands or ends of yarn are twisted together. There are many purposes where doubled yarn is used. Sometimes thread is doubled to make warp, and it is invariably used for the manufacture of knitting yarn, crochet yarn and sewing yarn. All these yarns must be smooth and free from knots. In a sewing thread, the threads are doubled in two phases. Two or three strands are twisted together then three of these threads are twisted together, to form a six or nine cord. The spun yarn is wound onto a bobbin using a doubling winding machine, and two or more of these bobbins are placed on doubling frame (doubling winding machine). The ends pass through a series of rollers and twisted together onto one bobbin using a spindle and flyer. The process here is similar to that found in one of Arkwrights Water frames, though the size of the ring, spindle and traveller are predictably larger. Alternatively a 'twiner' is used: this is a modified spinning mule and is mainly consigned to the doubling of warp thread. High quality doubling depended on keeping the tension correct and feeding the produced thread evenly and tightly on a bobbin or flangeless paper tubes

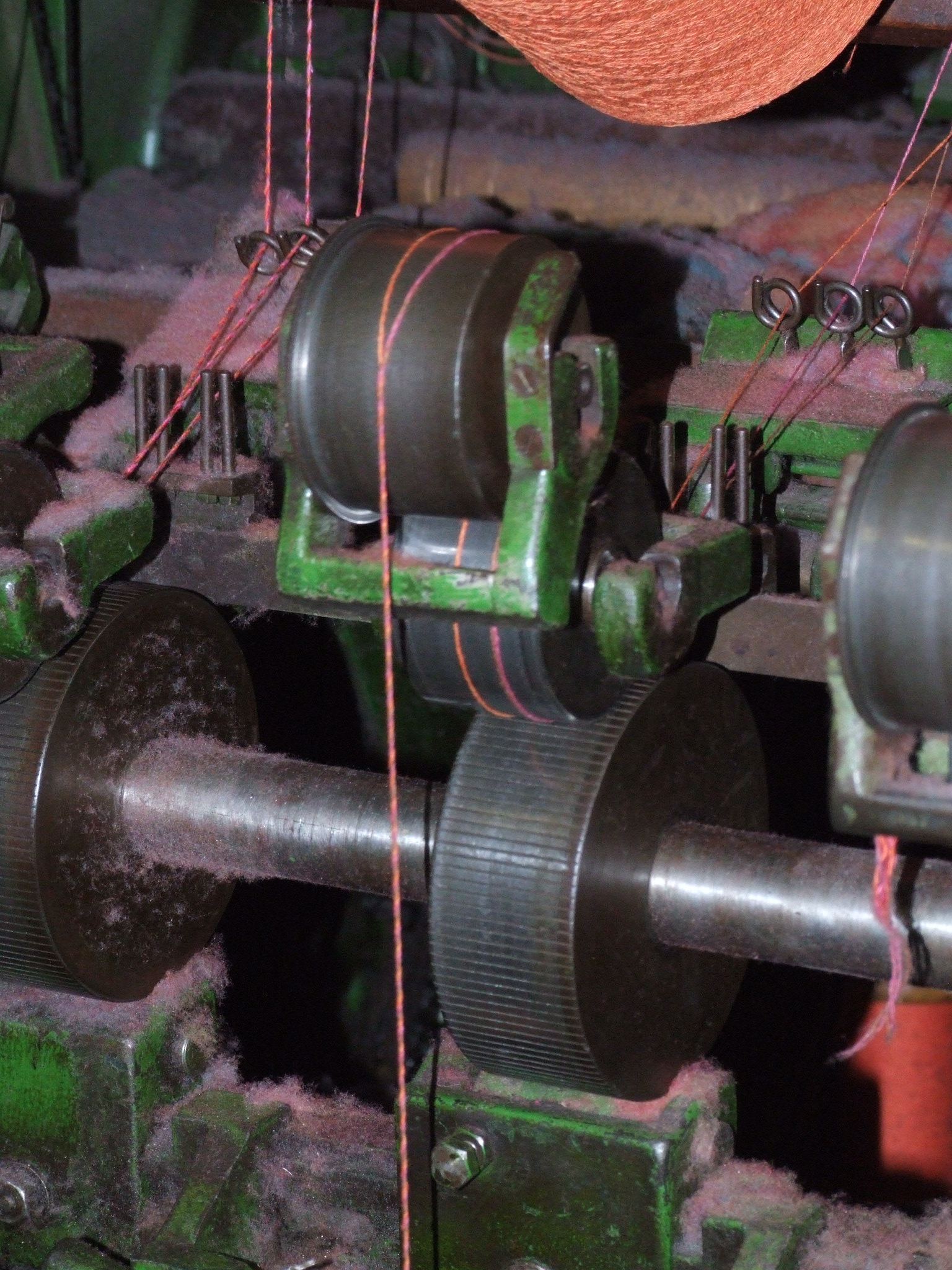

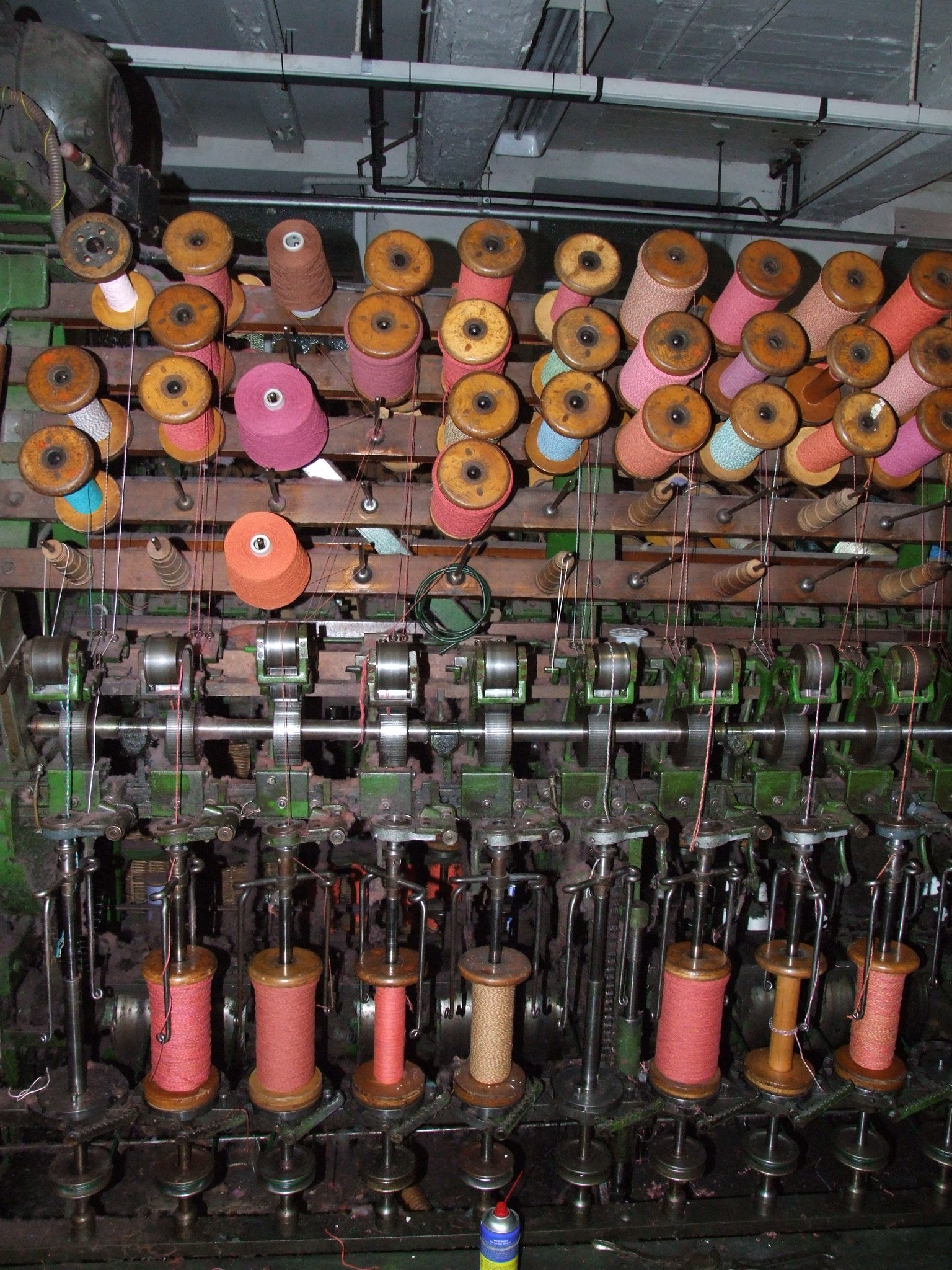

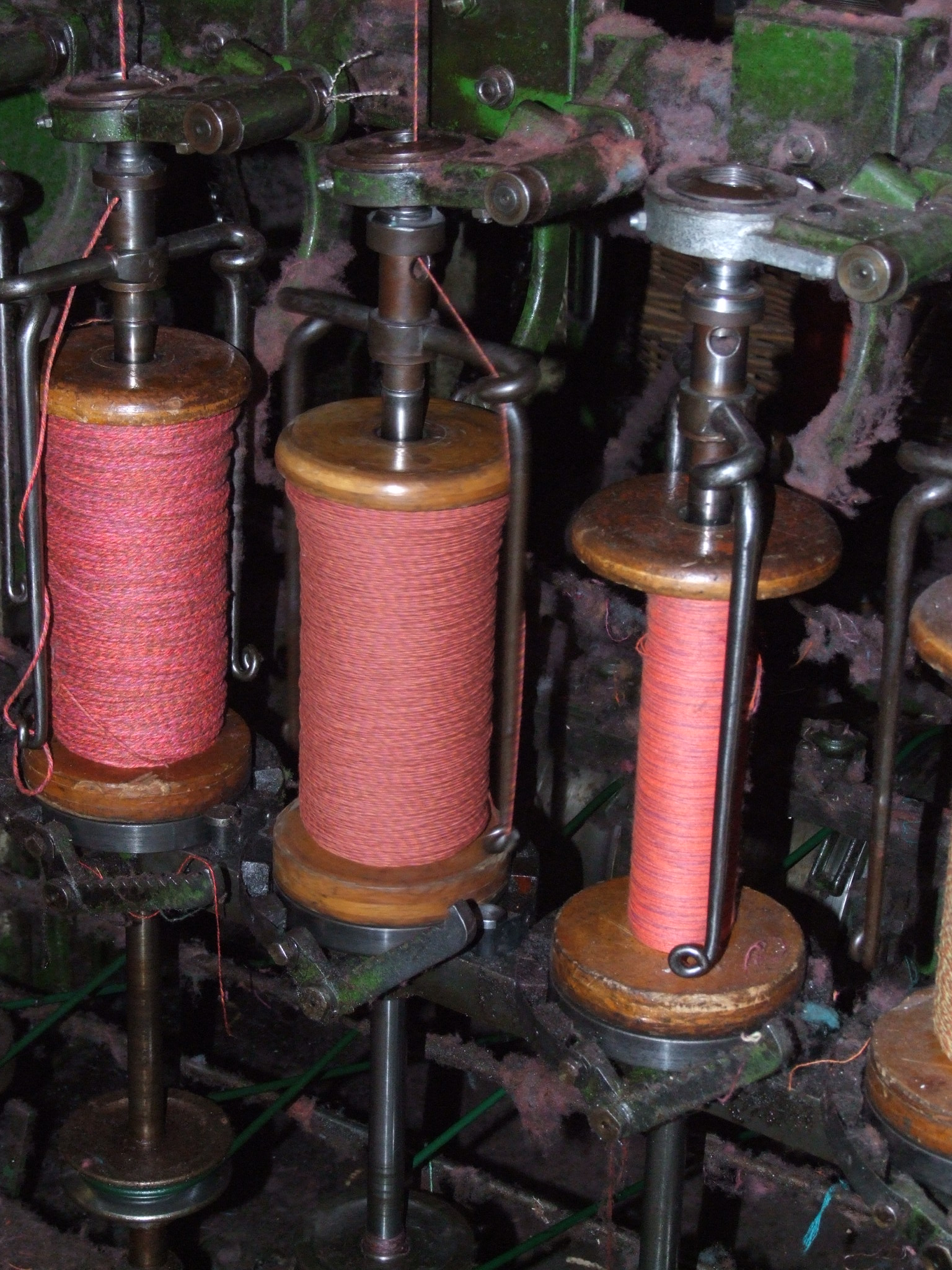

== See also ==
- Fine Cotton Spinners and Doublers Association, a major UK cotton spinning company
