= Listed buildings in Hathersage =

Hathersage is a civil parish in the Derbyshire Dales district of Derbyshire, England. The parish contains 54 listed buildings that are recorded in the National Heritage List for England. Of these, one is listed at Grade I, the highest of the three grades, three are at Grade II*, the middle grade, and the others are at Grade II, the lowest grade. The parish, which is almost entirely rural, contains the village of Hathersage and the surrounding countryside. Most of the listed buildings are farmhouses and farm buildings, houses, cottages, and associated structures. The other listed buildings include two churches, a cross shaft in a churchyard, a presbytery and a vicarage, two bridges, former mills, a milepost, a former toll house, a railway viaduct, and a lamp column.

== Key ==
Grade	Criteria
I	Buildings of exceptional interest, sometimes considered to be internationally important
II*	Particularly important buildings of more than special interest
II	Buildings of national importance and special interest

== Buildings ==
Name and location	Photograph	Date	Notes	Grade
St Michael and All Angels' Church; 53.33310°N 1.65012°W		14th century	The church has been altered and extended through the centuries, it was restored in 1851–52 by William Butterfield, and the vestry was added in 1947. The church is built in gritstone with slate roofs. It consists of a nave with a clerestory, north and south aisles, a south aisle porch, a chancel with a north chapel, a south vestry and a sacristy, and a slightly angled west steeple. The steeple has a tower with two stages on a three-step plinth, with stepped angle buttresses, and a three-light Perpendicular west window. Above a string course are bell openings with Y-tracery, cusped heads, and hood moulds. Over these are a moulded string course with gargoyles, an embattled parapet, and a recessed octagonal spire with crockets. There are embattled parapets along the body of the church.	I
Cross shaft 53.33301°N 1.64991°W		Late medieval	The cross shaft in the churchyard of St Michael and All Angels' Church is in gritstone. It consists of a broken tapering square shaft with chamfered corners, set into a circular recess within a shallow raised step at the centre of a massive square base stone.	II
Hathersage Hall; 53.33144°N 1.65071°W		1496	A small country house that has been altered and extended, and was remodelled in about 1830. It is in gritstone with quoins, a moulded eaves cornice, and stone slate roofs with coped gables and moulded kneelers. There is an irregular plan, including a tower with three storeys and a basement, and a stair tower with three storeys. The main doorway has a chamfered quoined surround, a Tudor arched head, a massive lintel, and a stepped hood mould. Some windows are mullioned, and others have been replaced by sashes.	II*
Barns at North Lees Hall; 53.34794°N 1.64822°W		16th century	A range of farm buildings in gritstone with quoins, roofs of stone slate and tile, and two storeys. They consist of a five-bay cowhouse with overlofts, a later L-shaped range, and a cart shed added in the 19th century. The cowhouse has six doorways with cambered heads and massive surrounds and lintels, slit vents, and a mullioned window, and inside are four cruck trusses. The later range contains a chamfered segmental arch.	II
Booth's Farmhouse; 53.32430°N 1.64006°W		Late 16th century	The farmhouse is in gritstone with quoins, and a stone slate roof with coped gables and moulded kneelers. There are two storeys and five bays. The doorways are coupled, and have chamfered surrounds and massive Tudor arched heads, and the windows are replacement casements. Above the ground floor openings is a continuous hood mould stepped over the doorways, and at the rear is a stair wing containing a mullioned window.	II
North Lees Hall; 53.34738°N 1.64800°W		Late 16th century	A tower house with an attached domestic range, in gritstone on a chamfered plinth, with quoins, the tower with an embattled parapet and moulded merlons. The tower house has three storeys and a basement, and a taller stair tower, mullioned and transomed windows with hood moulds, and a doorway with chamfered jambs and lintel. The domestic range has a stone slate roof with coped gables and moulded kneelers, two storeys, and three bays, the middle bay projecting and gabled, and the doorway has a moulded surround.	II*
Outbuildings east of Brookfield Manor; 53.34288°N 1.65353°W	—	17th century	The outbuildings are in gritstone and are arranged around an irregular courtyard, and they were extended and remodelled in 1870. The buildings consist of an arched gateway to the northeast with flanking outbuildings, a gatehouse to the southwest of the gateway, and a range of outbuildings, including a lesser arched entrance, stabling and servants quarters to the east of the gatehouse.	II
Barn southwest of Hathersage Hall; 53.33108°N 1.65125°W		17th century	The barn is in gritstone with quoins, and a tile roof with coped gables and moulded kneelers. There are two storeys and a T-shaped plan, consisting of a main range of five bays, and a two-bay cross-wing. In the main range is a full-height opening with a depressed arch and a keystone, a doorway with a massive quoined surround, and slit vents. The cross-wing has doorways and taking-in doors.	II
Lower Booths Farmhouse; 53.32358°N 1.64137°W		17th century	The farmhouse, later a private house, is in gritstone with quoins, and a stone slate roof with a coped gable and moulded kneelers on the southwest. There are two storeys and a T-shaped plan. The southeast front has three bays, a doorway with a quoined surround, and mullioned windows.	II
Mitchell Field Farmhouse; 53.33216°N 1.62925°W		17th century	The farmhouse is in gritstone with quoins, and a stone slate roof with coped gables and moulded kneelers. There are two storeys and four bays. The doorway has a quoined surround, some of the mullioned windows have been retained, and the others are replacement sashes.	II
House at Nether Hurst; 53.34211°N 1.66832°W	—	17th century	A farmhouse that has been altered, it is in roughcast gritstone with a stone slate roof. There are two storeys and four bays. The doorway has a chamfered quoined surround and a massive lintel, and the windows, which have been altered, include horizontally-sliding sashes.	II
Upper Hurst; 53.34821°N 1.66679°W	—	17th century	A farmhouse, later a private house, it is in gritstone with quoins, and a stone slate roof with moulded copings and kneelers to the southeast gable. There are two storeys and three bays, the northwest bay projecting and gabled. The doorway has a quoined surround and a massive lintel, and the windows are mullioned with three casements.	II
Kettle House; 53.31781°N 1.64191°W	—	Late 17th century	A house in gritstone with quoins, and a stone slate roof with a coped gable to the west. There are two storeys, two bays, and a single-storey offshut at the rear. The doorway has a heavy lintel, the windows are mullioned with casements, and there is a small fire window.	II
House northeast of Rock House; 53.33256°N 1.64897°W		Late 17th century	The house is in gritstone with quoins, and a stone slate roof with moulded gable copings and kneelers. There are two storeys, an L-shaped plan, and a gabled front with a recessed cross-wing. The windows are mullioned.	II
Outbuilding northeast of the Old Bell House; 53.33291°N 1.64971°W		Late 17th century	The farm outbuilding, later used for other purposes, is in gritstone with quoins, and a Welsh slate roof with coped gables and moulded kneelers. There are two storeys and three bays. The doorway has a massive lintel and jambs, and the windows are casements.	II
Hathersage Farmhouse; 53.32992°N 1.65586°W		Early 18th century	The farmhouse, later a private house, is in gritstone with quoins and a stone slate roof. There are two storeys and three bays. The main doorway has massive quoins and a lintel, and in the west bay is a doorway and an overloft doorway, both with quoined surrounds. The windows on the front have been replaced with casements and one sash window, and at the rear is a mullioned and transomed stair window.	II
Scraperlow Farmhouse and outbuildings 53.32889°N 1.63579°W		Early 18th century	The farmhouse and attached outbuildings were remodelled in the early 19th century. They are in gritstone with quoins and stone slate roofs. There are two storeys and nine bays, the three western bays forming the house. The house has a central doorway with a quoined surround, and two-light mullioned windows. The eastern three bays match the western bays, and have blocked openings. The middle three bays have an embattled parapet, under which are three cruciform embrasures. In the ground floor are semicircular arches with keystones, the middle arch open, and the outer arches infilled and containing doorways.	II
St Michael the Archangel Roman Catholic Church, walls, gate piers and gates 53.33086°N 1.65678°W		Early 18th century	A 'Mass House' was constructed on land donated by Adam Furniss, perhaps during the reign of James II (1685–88) or possibly later in 1692. Following anti-Catholic action, the building was soon ransacked and left ruined. Following the Roman Catholic Relief Act 1791 (31 Geo. 3. c. 32) William Southworth, a priest who had served the mission since 1780, was able to register the site. The Chapel was restored from 1798 and a house built for the resident priest, Edward Eyre, thanks to the generosity of the local Eyre and Furniss families. The Chapel was opened on 24 July 1806 and extended in 1860. It is in gritstone on a moulded plinth, with quoins, an eaves band, and a roof with coped gables and moulded kneelers. The church consists of a three-bay nave and a single-bay chancel, with a bellcote on the southwest gable. The doorway has a moulded surround and a hood mould on scroll brackets, and above it is a massive circular window with a moulded surround and a curved hood mould. The stained glass includes a late-19th-century window by Joseph Clarke of Dublin and a 20th-century window depicting the Padley Martyrs, Nicholas Garlick and Robert Ludlam. The boundary walls are in gritstone with half-round coping, and contains stone gate piers with pyramidal caps and decorative wrought iron gates.	II*
Valerian Cottage and attached cottage 53.33036°N 1.65523°W		Early 18th century	A pair of cottages in gritstone with quoins and a tile roof. There are two storeys and two bays. One doorway has a chamfered surround and a massive lintel, the other has a massive surround, and the windows are mullioned. In front of the garden is a low boundary wall with plain gate posts and flat copings.	II
Upper Burbage Bridge (east); 53.34330°N 1.60858°W	—	c. 1750	The bridge carries Ringinglow Road over a tributary of the Burbage Brook. It is in stone, and consists of a single round arch with large spandrel walls, and a plain parapet with slab coping.	II
Upper Burbage Bridge (west); 53.34339°N 1.60994°W	—	c. 1750	The bridge carries Ringinglow Road over the Burbage Brook. It is in stone, and consists of a single small round arch with stepped plinths, and massive spandrel walls with plain parapets and slab coping.	II
Eastwood Cottages; 53.33230°N 1.64844°W	—	Mid-18th century	A pair of cottages at the end of a terrace, in gritstone with quoins, and a roof of Welsh slate and stone slate with coped gables and moulded kneelers on the west. There are three storeys and two bays. The central doorway has a massive lintel and surround, and the windows are mullioned and contain two casements.	II
Greenwood Farmhouse; 53.31836°N 1.63666°W	—	Mid-18th century	The farmhouse is in gritstone with quoins and a stone slate roof. There are two storeys, two bays, and a later single-storey extension to the west. The doorway has a quoined surround, and the windows are mullioned.	II
Garden Pavilion and walls, Hathersage Hall; 53.33132°N 1.65226°W		Mid-18th century	The garden pavilion is in gritstone on a plinth, with a projecting band course, a moulded eaves cornice, and a pyramidal stone slate roof with a ball finial. On the front are double doorways with a central pier, arched heads and a small pediment. On the other fronts are single-light openings with elliptical-arched heads. The attached walls that enclose the roughly square garden are in gritstone with flat coping. They are about 3 metres (9.8 ft) high and are in lengths of about 100 metres (330 ft).	II
Overstones Farmhouse; 53.34229°N 1.62834°W		Mid-18th century	The farmhouse is in gritstone with quoins, bands, a projecting moulded eaves cornice, and a stone slate roof with coped gables. There are two storeys, a double depth plan, and two bays. The central doorway has a moulded surround, a keystone, a pulvinated frieze, and a moulded hood on console brackets. The windows are mullioned, and in the east and north fronts are transomed stair windows.	II
Upper Hurst Farmhouse; 53.34854°N 1.66712°W	—	Mid-18th century	A farmhouse, later a private house, it is in gritstone with quoins and a tile roof. There are two storeys and five bays, the northeast bay projecting and gabled. The central doorway has quoining on the east side, the windows on the front are mullioned, and at the rear are single-light windows with chamfered surrounds.	II
Broomfield and railings 53.33029°N 1.65406°W		Late 18th century	A gritstone house with quoins, and a roof that has gables with moulded coping. There are two storeys and two bays. The central doorway has heavy jambs and a lintel, and the windows are sashes with deep lintels. In front of the house is a low stone plinth with cast iron railings.	II
Hall Farmhouse, wall and gate piers 53.33118°N 1.65195°W		Late 18th century	The farmhouse is in gritstone with quoins and a slate roof with coped gables and plain kneelers. There are two storeys and three bays. The doorway has a quoined surround, a heavy lintel, and a moulded hood on moulded brackets, and the windows have small panes. On the southeast boundary of the garden is a wall with half-round copings, containing square gate piers with plain caps, and a doorway with a semicircular-arched head.	II
Outbuilding northwest of North Lees Hall; 53.34755°N 1.64815°W	—	Late 18th century	The outbuildings are in gritstone with quoins, stone slate roofs, and a single storey. Attached are coped enclosure walls with animal shelters.	II
The Cottage; 53.33113°N 1.65358°W		Late 18th century	A house in gritstone with quoins and a roof of Welsh slate and stone slate. There are two storeys and two bays, and a catslide roof at the rear. The central doorway has a quoined surround and a heavy lintel, the windows on the front are mullioned with two casements, and at the rear is a mullioned and transomed window.	II
The Old Bell House; 53.33284°N 1.64995°W		Late 18th century	A gritstone house with quoins, and a stone slate roof with a coped gable and moulded kneelers on the southwest. There are two storeys and three bays. The doorway has a massive surround and lintel, the upper floor windows are mullioned with two lights, and in the ground floor are replacement casements.	II
The 1781 Cottages; 53.33067°N 1.65400°W		1781	A workshop, later three cottages, in gritstone with a stone slate roof. There are two storeys and attics, and three bays, and offshuts at the rear. There are three doorways, and the windows are casements.	II
Rectory, St Michael's Roman Catholic Church and wall 53.33084°N 1.65660°W		1799	The presbytery is in gritstone on a plinth, with rusticated quoins, a moulded eaves cornice, and a hipped stone slate roof. There are two storeys, a double depth plan, and three bays. The central doorway has a semicircular fanlight, and the windows are sashes. The boundary wall is in stone with flat coping.	II
Outbuilding south-southwest of Hathersage Hall; 53.33093°N 1.65127°W		c. 1800	The outbuilding is in red brick with bands, a dentilled eaves cornice, and a pyramidal stone slate roof surmounted by a louvred lantern with a lead pyramidal roof. There are two storeys and an attic, and a square plan. The northeast front has a carriage entrance with a depressed segmental arch, in the southeast front is a Diocletian window, and the northwest front contains a stone-framed opening.	II
Brookfield Manor; 53.34304°N 1.65386°W		c. 1825	A small country house incorporating material from an earlier house, it was extended in 1870. The house is in gritstone, and has slate roofs with moulded gable copings. There is an irregular plan, including gabled projections and two tall turrets with embattled parapets. The southeast front has two storeys and six bays. The main doorway has double doors in a moulded surround with a Tudor arched head. Some windows are sashes, others are mullioned, and all have Gothic tracery.	II
1–3 Bank Top; 53.33286°N 1.64950°W		Early 19th century	A range of gritstone cottages that have stone slate roofs with coped gables and moulded kneelers. There are two storeys and four bays, the right bay lower. The doorways have massive jambs and plain lintels, and the windows are sashes.	II
Cliffe Cottage; 53.33024°N 1.65833°W		Early 19th century	The house, which incorporates earlier material, is in gritstone with quoins, and a slate roof with coped gables and moulded kneelers. There are two storeys, an L-shaped plan, a front range of two bays, and an earlier lower rear wing. The central doorway has moulded jambs and a lintel, a rectangular fanlight, and a hood mould. The windows on the front have flush surrounds, and those in the rear wing are mullioned.	II
Dale Mill and chimney 53.33217°N 1.64820°W		Early 19th century	A wire drawing mill, later used as a workshop, it is in gritstone with hipped stone slate roofs. There are three storeys, and an L-shaped plan, with a main block of seven bays, and a short wing to the east. The windows are sashes in plain surrounds, and in the east wing is a semicircular-headed opening in the upper floor. Detached and to the east of the wing is a tapering square stone chimney.	II
Kimber Court; 53.33849°N 1.64383°W		Early 19th century	A farmhouse incorporating earlier material, in gritstone with quoins, and a stone slate roof with coped gables and moulded kneelers. There are two storeys and three bays. The central doorway has a quoined surround and a bracketed hood, and the windows are mullioned.	II
Leach House, cottage and outbuilding 53.32291°N 1.64994°W		Early 19th century	The building, at one time an inn, is in gritstone with quoins, and a stone slate roof with a coped gable and moulded kneelers at the northwest end. There are two storeys and an irregular plan. The house has three bays, a central doorway with a massive surround and sash windows. The cottage, at an angle, has two bays, and contains a doorway and a double doorway, both with quoined surrounds, the latter with a massive lintel. The outbuilding has a single bay, it contains a doorway, and in the gable end is an opening in the ground floor and a taking-in door above.	II
Milepost; 53.33069°N 1.65131°W		Early 19th century	The milepost is on the south side of Main Road, and is in cast iron. It has a triangular section, a dished top, and two faces below. On the faces are inscribed "HATHERSAGE", and the distances to Castleton, Chapel-en-le-Frith, and Sheffield.	II
Outbuilding northwest of Nether Hall; 53.32617°N 1.66130°W	—	Early 19th century	The outbuilding is in gritstone with quoins and a stone slate roof. There are two storeys and four bays, the south bay projecting. In the centre is a full-height carriage arch, and to the north is a doorway with tooled jambs, above which is a dovecote entrance with a semicircular-headed lintel. In the south bay is a bull's eye window, and a dovecote with perch stones.	II
The Vicarage and walling 53.33306°N 1.65080°W		Early 19th century	The vicarage is in gritstone with quoins and a roof of stone slate and tile. There are two storeys and an irregular U-shaped plan. The south front has four bays, in the left bay is a two-storey canted bay window, and the other windows are sashes. The doorway has a quoined surround and a heavy lintel. The garden to the south of the house is enclosed by a tall gritstone wall with shallow saddleback copings.	II
Toll Bar Cottage; 53.32591°N 1.64649°W		Early 19th century	The former toll house is in Tudor style, in gritstone, and has a stone slate roof with coped gables and moulded kneelers. There is a single storey and two bays. The central doorway has a chamfered surround and a pointed-arched head, and the windows are mullioned with two lights and semicircular-arched heads; all the openings have hood moulds.	II
Former Gamekeepers Lodge, Brookfield Manor; 53.34334°N 1.65263°W		c. 1830	The former lodge is in gritstone with a stone slate roof, two storeys and two bays. The central doorway has a chamfered surround, and the windows are mullioned, those in the ground floor under a continuous stepped hood mould.	II
Mill Cottage; 53.32774°N 1.65750°W		c. 1830	A gritstone house with a stone slate roof, two storeys and two bays. The doorway has a chamfered surround, a heavy lintel, and a hood mould, and the windows are mullioned with casements.	II
Rock House, outbuilding and entrance 53.33239°N 1.64922°W		c. 1830	The house is in gritstone, with rock-faced rusticated quoins and dressings, sill bands, a moulded eaves cornice, and a stone slate roof, hipped at the northeast end, and with moulded copings to the southwest gable. There are two storeys and five bays. The doorway and windows have massive rock-faced Gibbs surrounds. The outbuilding has an embattled parapet and pinnacles. Flanking the entrance are square rusticated gate piers with depressed pyramidal caps, and the ornamental gates are in cast iron.	II
Outbuildings west of Hathersage Hall; 53.33125°N 1.65167°W		c. 1840	The outbuildings, later used for other purposes, are in gritstone with quoins, and Welsh slate roofs with coped gables. The main range has two storeys and five bays. To the northeast is a low two-storey outbuilding with an external stairway, further to the northeast is a two-storey range containing a mullioned window, and with a single-storey lean-to.	II
Outbuilding west-southwest of Hathersage Hall; 53.33125°N 1.65138°W		c. 1840	The outbuilding is in gritstone with quoins, and a tile roof with coped gables. There are two storeys and six bays. On the front is a cart entrance with a depressed arch and a keystone, a doorway with a quoined surround, and semicircular-headed windows. The upper floor contains windows with one or two lights.	II
Nether Hall; 53.32603°N 1.66082°W	—	1840	A small country house in Jacobean style incorporating elements of an earlier house, it is in gritstone, and has a slate roof with coped gables and moulded kneelers. There are two storeys and an irregular plan, with a main elongated L-shaped plan. The front has four bays, at the northwest end is a gabled range, a projecting three-storey tower, and a stair turret in the angle. The tower and turret have embattled parapets. The main doorway has a chamfered Tudor arch and a massive surround and lintel, and above it is a hood mould with a plaque containing a shield and the date. The windows are mullioned, or mullioned and transomed.	II
Whim Cottage; 53.32233°N 1.63723°W		1844	A lodge at a road junction, it is in gritstone with quoins and a stone slate roof. There are two storeys, and two stepped bays. The taller bay contains two-light mullioned windows with hood moulds, and the lower range has a lean-to porch and a doorway with a Tudor arched head. In the southwest gable is a dated oval plaque with a hood mould.	II
Barnfield Works and chimney 53.32905°N 1.65725°W		c. 1850	A mill, later workshops, in gritstone, with rusticated quoins, and a Welsh slate roof. There are two storeys and ten bays, the four northeast bays a dwelling. The fourth bay projects slightly under a pediment with a roundel, and contains an entrance that has a depressed arch with rusticated voussoirs and a keystone. The windows are sashes, one modified to serve as a hoist entry, and at the rear is a detached tapering square stone chimney.	II
Railway Viaduct; 53.32825°N 1.65791°W		c. 1892	The viaduct was built by the North Midland Railway to carry its line over Hood Brook. It is in gritstone, and consists of seven semicircular arches with brick linings and voussoirs. The massive piers are rectangular and tapering, with a plinth course at the junction of the arch and the pier. Above the arches, is a flat band course, and coped parapets.	II
Lamp column 53.32997°N 1.65622°W		1914	The lamp column is by a road junction near Hathersage Farmhouse, and is in cast iron on a circular stone base and a square platform. The column has a wide fluted base, a slender shaft, and triple lamps to the head carried on ornamental scroll brackets. On the base is an inscribed plaque.	II
