= Listed buildings in Bamford =

Bamford is a civil parish in the High Peak district of Derbyshire, England. The parish contains eight listed buildings that are recorded in the National Heritage List for England. Of these, one is listed at Grade II*, the middle of the three grades, and the others are at Grade II, the lowest grade. The parish contains the village of Bamford, and is otherwise rural. The listed buildings consist of a farmhouse and two associated barns, a bridge, and two churches with associated structures.

== Key ==
Grade	Criteria
II*	Particularly important buildings of more than special interest
II	Buildings of national importance and special interest

== Buildings ==
Name and location	Photograph	Date	Notes	Grade
Moore's Farmhouse; 53.34889°N 1.68947°W	—	Early 19th century	The farmhouse is in gritstone with a stone slate roof. There are two storeys and three bays. The doorway is in the centre, and the windows are sashes.	II
Barn north-northeast of Moore's Farmhouse; 53.34901°N 1.68928°W	—	Early 19th century	The barn is in gritstone, and has a corrugated iron roof. There are two storeys and two bays. It contains a central carriage arch with quoins and voussoirs, now infilled and a doorway inserted. To the right is a doorway with stable doors, and above are two windows.	II
Barn north of Moore's Farmhouse; 53.34903°N 1.68944°W	—	Early 19th century	The barn is in gritstone with quoins and a stone slate roof. There are two storeys and two bays. In each bay is a doorway with a quoined surround and a lintel. To the right and in the upper floor are single-light windows.	II
Yorkshire Bridge; 53.36122°N 1.70387°W		Early 19th century	The bridge carries a road over the River Derwent, it is in gritstone, and consists of two broad segmental arches. The bridge has semicircular cutwaters, voussoirs, bands, and parapets with curved coping stones. The walls curve outwards, and at the ends are square pillars.	II
St John the Baptist's Church; 53.34689°N 1.68961°W		1856–60	The church was designed by William Butterfield and is in gritstone with a Welsh slate roof. It consists of a nave, a north aisle, a chancel, a west narthex, and a northwest steeple. The steeple has a tower of two unequal stages, and it contains a west doorway acting as a porch, three-light bell openings in recessed panels, quatrefoil motifs at the corners, and a pyramidal spire with lucarnes and narrow carved bands. At the west end of the church is a rose window set in a pointed arch and flanked by narrow lights.	II*
Gateway and boundary wall, St John the Baptist's Church; 53.34697°N 1.69003°W		1856–60	The gateway and boundary wall were designed by William Butterfield, and are in gritstone. The wall has chamfered coping, it forms the western boundary of the churchyard, and is stepped down the hill. The gateway consists of a chamfered arch with a stepped gable containing an octafoil.	II
Rectory and Coach House; 53.34660°N 1.68905°W	—	1856–60	The rectory and coach house were designed by William Butterfield, they are in gritstone, and have Welsh slate roofs with coped gables and moulded kneelers. There are two storeys and attics, and three bays, the middle bays projecting and gabled. In the middle bay of the south front is a tripartite window, including a French window, and the other windows are sashes, with a gabled dormer in the left bay. The north front has a projecting porch with a hipped roof, a trefoiled stair window, and a string course, and attached to the southeast is a coach house and a low wall.	II
Church of Our Lady of Sorrows and Presbytery; 53.35035°N 1.69041°W		1882	The church and attached presbytery are in gritstone, and have stone slate roofs with coped gables and moulded kneelers. The church has an east porch, a bellcote with a comical cap on the south gable, and the windows are mullioned and transomed. The presbytery to the north has two storeys and three bays, the right bay gabled and taller. There are moulded floor bands, a central doorway approached by six steps with a segmental-headed fanlight. This is flanked by canted bay windows, and the other windows are mullioned.	II
