= James Holworthy =

British painter (1781–1841)

James Holworthy (1781–1841) was a British watercolour artist. Some of Holworthy's art can be seen in the Tate Gallery.

Holworthy exhibited at the Royal Academy in 1803 and 1804. In the latter year he was one of the foundation members of the Society of Painters in Water-colours, now known as the Royal Watercolour Society, and he contributed constantly to their exhibitions till 1813. His subjects being drawn from Wales, the Lake district, and Yorkshire. He practised in London till 1822. In 1900, there were two drawings by him at the South Kensington Museum.

In 1821, Holworthy was living in Barton in the Beans, Leicestershire. In 1821 he married Anne Wright, a niece of Joseph Wright of Derby in Derby, and retired to the Brookfield estate, near Hathersage in Derbyshire, which he had purchased. He died in London in 1841, was buried at Kensal Green. He was a friend of J. M. W. Turner, R.A.
