= St Michael and All Angels' Church, Hathersage =

St Michael and All Angels’ Church, Hathersage
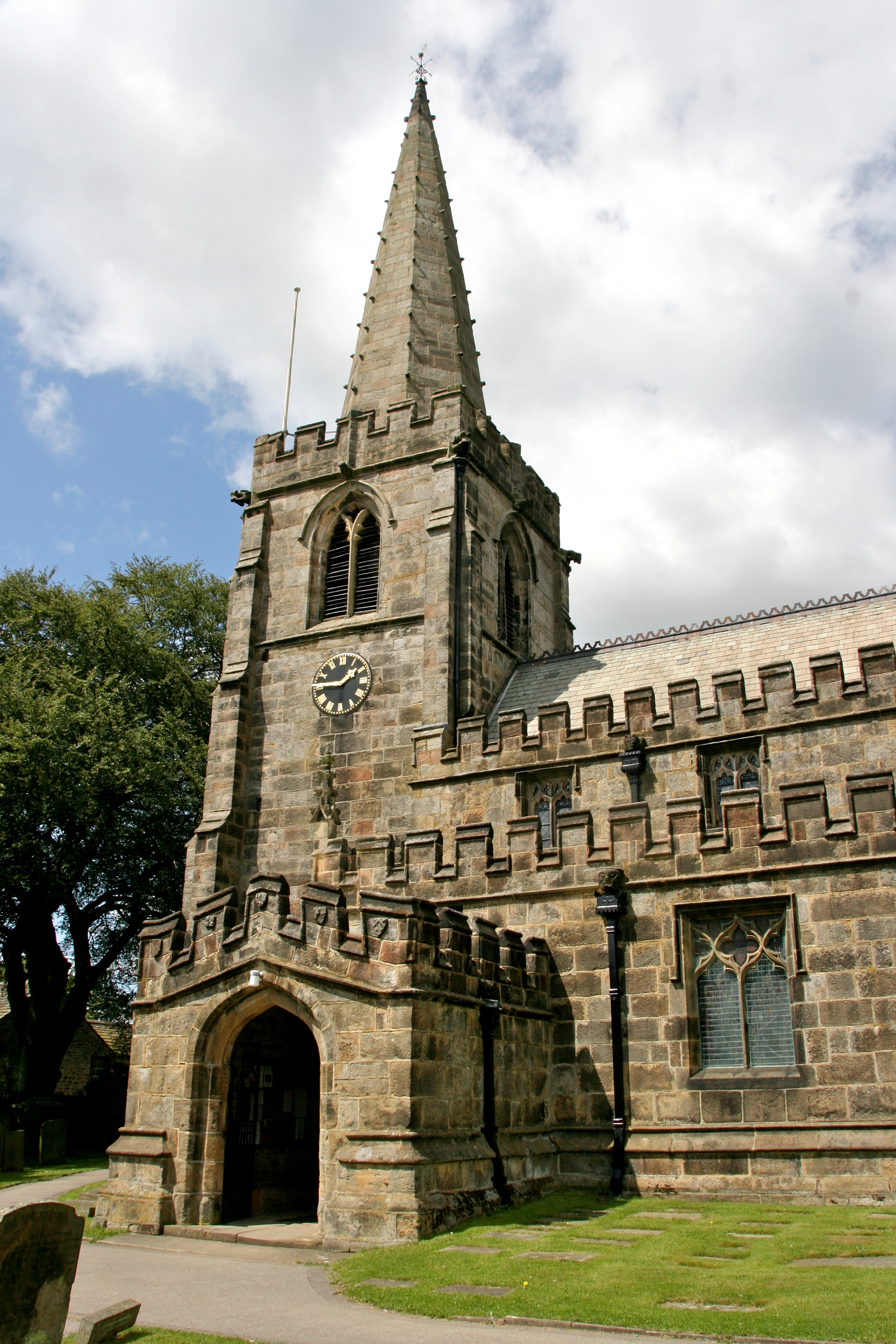
- St Michael and All Angels’ Church, Hathersage
- St Michael and All Angels’ Church, Hathersage
- 53°19′59.94″N 1°39′1.37″W
- Location: Hathersage
- Country: England
- Denomination: Church of England

History
- Dedication: St Michael and All Angels

Architecture
- Heritage designation: Grade I listed

Administration
- Diocese: Diocese of Derby
- Archdeaconry: Chesterfield
- Deanery: Peak
- Parish: Hathersage

Clergy
- Vicar: Paul Moore

St Michael and All Angels’ Church, Hathersage, is a Grade I listed parish church in the Church of England in Hathersage, Derbyshire.

== History ==
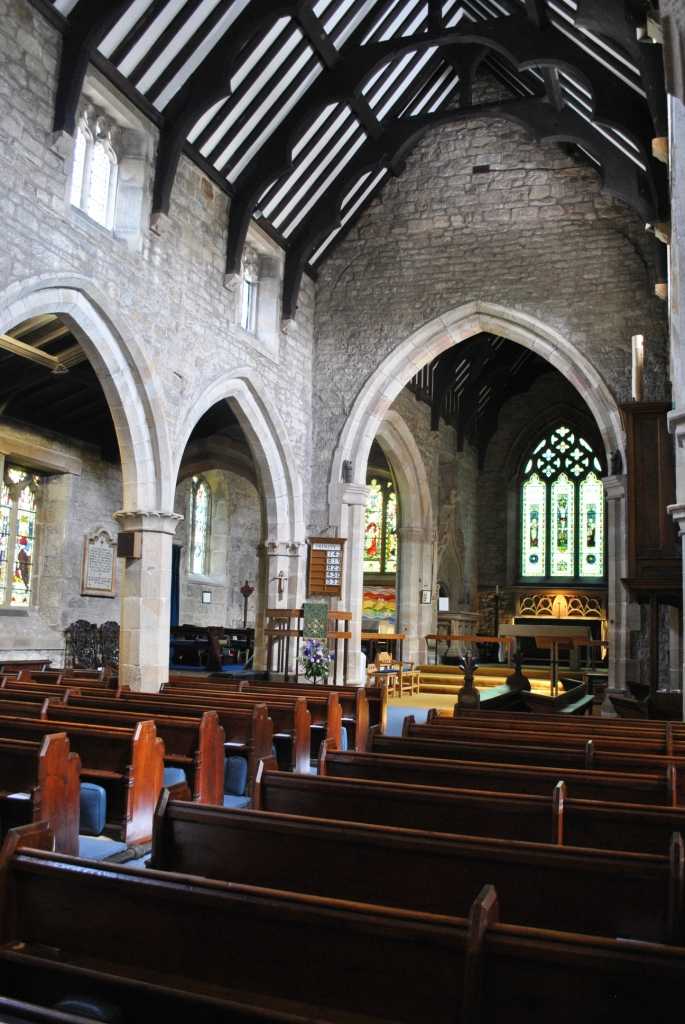
The nave and chancel

The church dates from the 14th century. It was restored between 1851 and 1852 by William Butterfield and reopened on 15 April 1852. The whitewash on the walls was removed and the outer pillars and buttresses were renewed. The church was re-pewed with open seats. A new stained-glass window by William Wailes of Newcastle was inserted at the east end of the chancel. There is a stained-glass window by Charles Kempe, which was removed from Derwent Chapel before it was submerged under the Ladybower Reservoir. The church was tiled with Minton encaustic tiles. The total cost of the restoration was £1,575 (equivalent to £190,000 in 2025).

There were some further extensions added in 1949. New gutter lining and the instalment of diorite plugs improved the waterproofing of the building.

== Tomb of Little John ==
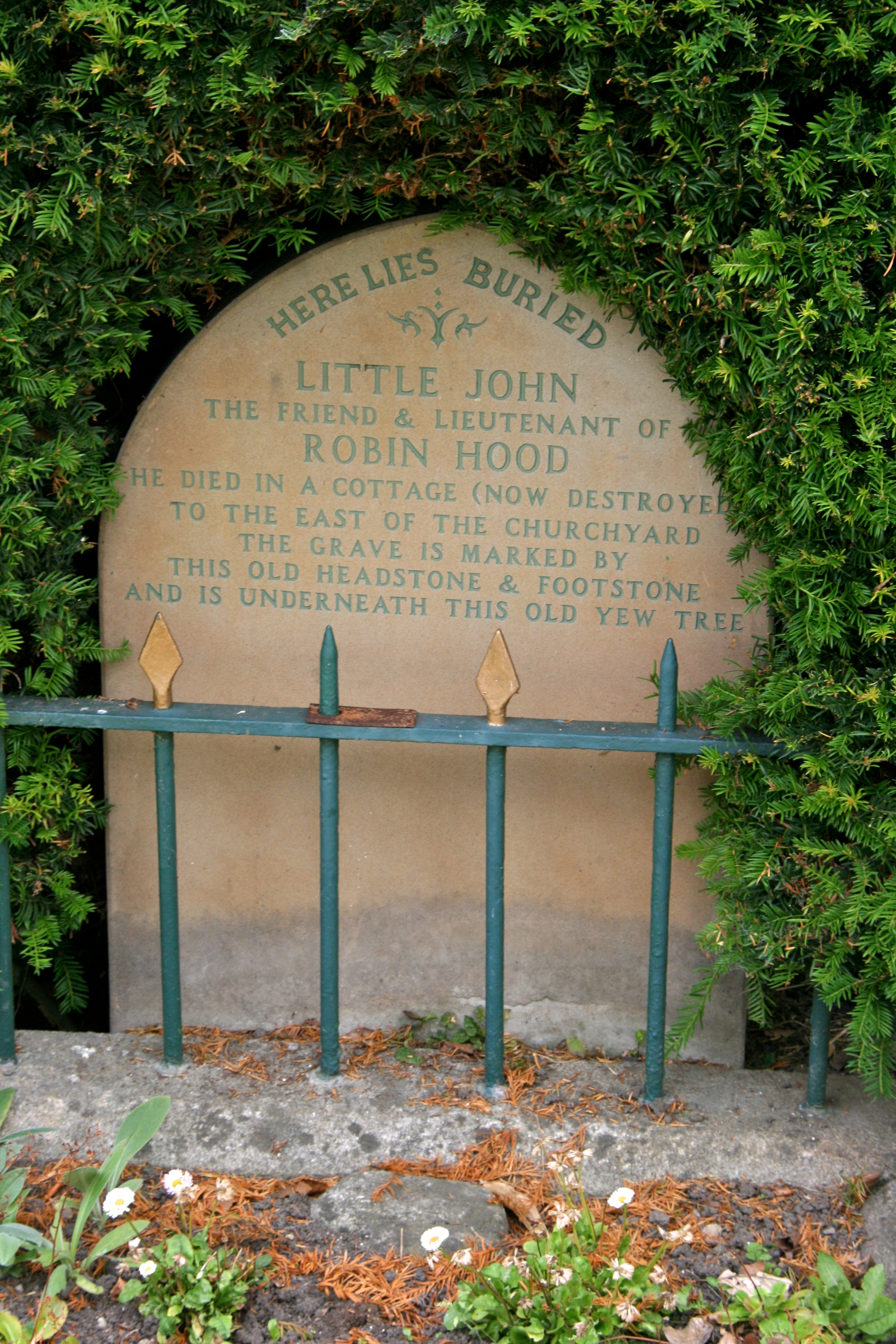
The alleged grave of Little John

Stones in the churchyard mark what is claimed to be the grave of Little John, where in 1780 James Shuttleworth claims to have unearthed a thigh bone measuring 72.39 centimetres (28.50 in). This would have made Little John 8.08 feet (2.46 m) in height.

== Parish status ==
The church is in a joint parish with St John the Baptist's Church, Bamford and Derwent. The decision to merge the churches was made in 2014 because of financial hardship and enabled all three churches to survive.

== Memorials ==
- Robert Eyre (d. 1459) and his wife Joan
- Radulph Eyre (d. 1493) and his wife Elizabeth
- Sir Arthur Eyre (d. 1560)

== Organ ==
The church contains a pipe organ by James Jepson Binns which was formerly in Wadsley Bridge Methodist Church, Sheffield, and was moved here in 1981 by Gilbert Sellers. A specification of the organ can be found on the National Pipe Organ Register.

== Bells ==
The tower contains a ring of six bells with the oldest dating from ca. 1520. In addition there is a sanctus bell dating from ca. 1499.

== Clock ==
A new clock by John Smith was erected in 1879 which showed the time on a single dial 5 feet (1.5 m) in diameter. The escapement was a pin wheel deat beat, driving a compensating pendulum with a bob of 130 pounds (59 kg) weight. It was installed through the generosity of George H. Camwell of Brookfield Manor in memory of his father.

== See also ==
- Grade I listed churches in Derbyshire
- Grade I listed buildings in Derbyshire
- Listed buildings in Hathersage
