= Our Lady of Sorrows Church, Bamford =

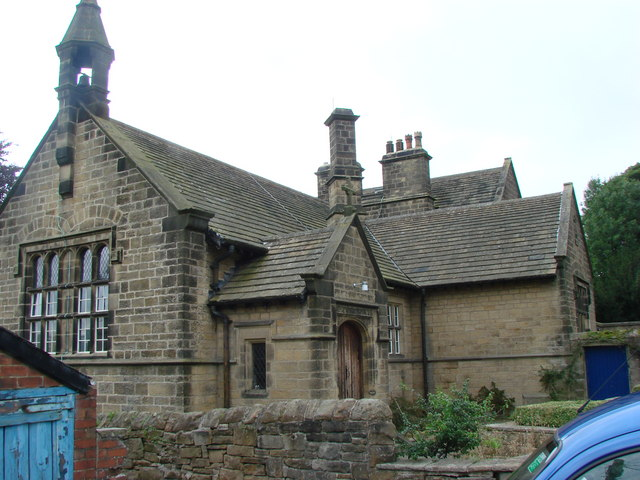
- Our Lady of Sorrows Church, Bamford
- Our Lady of Sorrows Church, Bamford
- 53.350376°N 1.690501°W
- Location: Bamford, Derbyshire
- Country: England
- Denomination: Roman Catholic

History
- Dedication: Our Lady of Sorrows

Architecture
- Heritage designation: Grade II
- Designated: 24 September 1984
- Architect: Matthew Ellison Hadfield
- Completed: 1882

Administration
- Diocese: Hallam

Our Lady of Sorrows Church, Bamford is a Roman Catholic church in the village of Bamford, Derbyshire. The church dates back to the mid-19th century and is a Grade II listed building. It was designed by M. E. Hadfield and built for Henry Fitzalan-Howard, 15th Duke of Norfolk, who had founded a similar chapel at Derwent Hall.

== See also ==
- Listed buildings in Bamford
