= St John the Baptist's Church, Bamford =

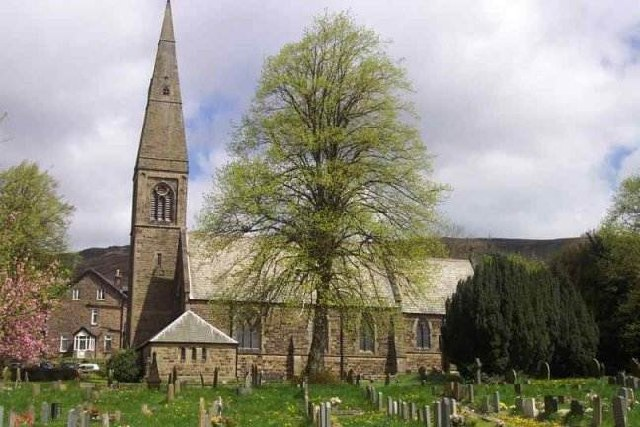
- St John the Baptist's Church, Bamford

- Location within Derbyshire
- 53°20′52.8″N 1°41′36.67″W
- OS grid reference: SK 20760 83376
- Location: Bamford
- Country: England
- Denomination: Church of England

History
- Dedication: St John the Baptist
- Consecrated: 17 October 1860

Architecture
- Heritage designation: Grade II* listed
- Architect: William Butterfield
- Groundbreaking: 1859
- Completed: 1860

Specifications
- Height: 108 feet (33 m)

Administration
- Province: Canterbury
- Diocese: Derby
- Archdeaconry: Chesterfield
- Deanery: Bakewell & Eyam
- Parish: Bamford and Derwent

St John the Baptist church is a C of E church in Bamford in the Hope Valley, Derbyshire, England.

== History ==
The building that is seen today is largely a William Butterfield restoration dating from 1860, with a bell tower. The new church was consecrated on 17 October 1860 by the Bishop of Lichfield.

== Parish status ==
The church is in a joint parish with St Michael and All Angels' Church, Hathersage.

== Organ ==
A pipe organ was built by Albert Keates of Sheffield. It was rebuilt and extended in 1958 by T.C. Wilcock of Sheffield. A specification of the organ can be found on the National Pipe Organ Register.

== The bells and tower ==
A peal of six bells was provided at the rebuilding in 1860 by Naylor, Vickers and Co of Sheffield. The tower currently has six ringable bells, cast in 1998 by John Taylor & Co to mark the Millennium. The modern bells have sprung metal stays instead of wooden ones. The Treble weighs 1 hundredweight 3 quarters and 12lb (94.4 kg). The tenor weighs 1 hundredweight and 26lb (215.2 kg). The bellringers practice on Wednesdays.

== The churchyard ==
Exhumations from the cemetery of the village of Derwent were re-interred in St John's churchyard after the construction of the Ladybower Dam submerged that village during the Second World War. Also in the graveyard is a grave marking the dead from Tin Town (Birchinlee), a temporary village made to house the workers who built the Derwent and the Howden dams in 1902. There is also a memorial for the dead of the Holocaust. The churchyard contains war graves from World War I of two male soldiers, a female member of Queen Mary's Army Auxiliary Corps and a Royal Air Force airman.

== Location ==
Main Road, Bamford, Hope Valley, Derbyshire, England, UK

Opposite St John's Close

== See also ==
- Grade II* listed buildings in High Peak
- Listed buildings in Bamford
- Bamford railway station
- Brough and Shatton
- Hope Valley
- Birchinlee
- River Derwent
