= P. & C. Garnett Ltd =

British textile engineering company

- Type: Private limited company
- Industry: Textile engineering
- Founded: 1850
- Founder: Peter Garnett
- Headquarters: Elland, West Yorkshire, UK
- Products: Metallic card clothing, saw-tooth wire, Garnett machines
- Website: www.garnettwire.com

P. & C. Garnett Ltd (later succeeded by Garnett Wire Ltd) was a British textile engineering and ironfounding company based in Cleckheaton, West Yorkshire. The firm is most notable for inventing the "Garnett machine" and "Garnett wire", a specialized metallic saw-tooth wire used to clothe rollers in carding and waste-opening machines. The widespread adoption of their machinery in the textile recycling industry led to the mechanical process of recovering fibers being generically known as "garnetting".

== History ==
=== Founding and early development ===
The company was established in 1850 (sometimes recorded as 1851) by Peter Garnett (1825–1900) and Charles Garnett. Operating originally out of the Prince Works, and later the Wharfe Works in Cleckheaton, the firm specialized in manufacturing pulleys and preparatory textile machinery.

Peter Garnett developed a patented saw-tooth wire that differed from contemporary card clothing, which traditionally used wire teeth set in leather or rubber foundations. The all-steel, wedge-shaped teeth were formed by punching and cutting intervals along the wire, which was then wound into spiral grooves on rollers to create a highly rigid opening surface.

In 1865, mechanical engineer John Henry Leather (1842–1912) joined the firm as a resident manager and partner. Leather was instrumental in advancing the firm's technology; in 1877, he patented a method for securing the toothed wire in double rows upon the carding cylinders. This advance allowed rollers to be clothed much more densely, which facilitated the processing of finer materials and led to the development of specialized "Morel" rollers for the mechanical removal of burrs from raw wool.

=== Corporate succession and modern operations ===
The business was incorporated as a limited company in 1897. By 1914, P. & C. Garnett Ltd had grown to employ 160 people and was globally recognized for its specialized saw-tooth wire used in cotton and worsted cards.

The original partnership's legacy was succeeded by Garnett Wire Ltd, which was incorporated under its modern corporate structure in 1991. The successor company continued to manufacture metallic card clothing and saw-tooth wires for the global nonwoven and textile industries from sites in Cleckheaton and Elland. In 2024, it consolidated its operations at a new facility in Elland to modernize its manufacturing and servicing capabilities.

== Garnetting process and legacy ==
P. & C. Garnett's machinery was a key technological advance in the 19th-century shoddy and mungo industries, which were heavily centered in the nearby West Riding towns of Batley and Dewsbury.

The "Garnett machine" functioned as a modified carding engine, using a series of cylinders covered in the rigid, saw-tooth Garnett wire. As it revolved, the wire effectively shredded and deconstructed discarded woolen, worsted, silk, and cotton wastes back into a fibrous state suitable for re-spinning.

The equipment superseded previous mechanical methods and established a standard industrial blueprint for material recovery. Consequently, "Garnett" became a genericized trademark within the global textile trade. The term was adopted globally as a noun, verb, and adjective, with Canadian French adopting the term garnettage to describe the process of waste fiber recovery.

== See also ==
- Textile recycling
