= Barloworld Scientific =

Former British manufacturer

- Industry: Manufacturing
- Successor: Nova Capital (2007)
- Headquarters: United Kingdom
- Products: scientific equipment laboratory supplies

Barloworld Scientific Ltd. was one of the UK's largest manufacturers of scientific equipment and laboratory supplies. In 2007, the company was purchased by Nova Capital Ltd and now trades under the names SciLabware Limited (glassware, and reusable plastics), Bibby-Scientific (benchtop scientific equipment), Bibby-Sterlin Ltd. (single use disposable plasticware) and, until 2012, Carbolite (furnaces, ovens and incubators). Carbolite was purchased by Verder Scientific who also purchased Gero. It is now known as Carbolite Gero.
