= Evan Leigh =

English author, inventor, engineer (1810-1876)

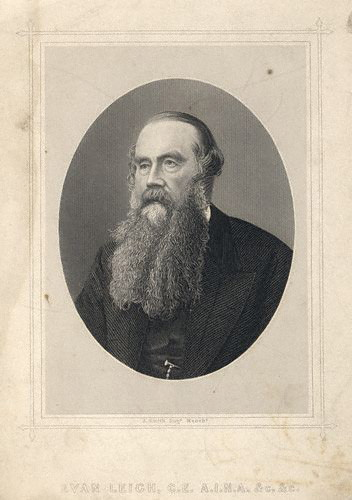
- Evan Leigh
- Born: 21 December 1810; Ashton-under-Lyne, Lancashire, England, United Kingdom
- Died: 2 February 1876 (aged 65); Chorlton-on-Medlock, Manchester, Lancashire, England, United Kingdom
- Occupations: Engineer, inventor

Evan Leigh (21 December 1810 – 2 February 1876) was an English author, inventor, engineer and manufacturer of cotton spinning equipment. His invention of the twin screw for steam ships was patented in July 1849 and taken up both for mercantile and Royal Navy fleets.

== Biography ==
He was born in Ashton-under-Lyne, Lancashire. He was the son of Peter Leigh, a cotton mill owner. Upon leaving school aged 16 he spent two years in Europe studying and observing engineering and science. When he returned home he took up employment in the family's cotton spinning mill. After about 25 years he retired from cotton spinning and took up the manufacture of cotton spinning machinery. He patented among other things the Self Stripping Engine, the Derby Doubler or Lap Machine and the Loose Boss Top Roller. Supplying machines worldwide from his Collyhurst Works in Miles Platting, Manchester after moving from Cotton Street, Ashton-under-Lyne.

In 1870 he published a pamphlet: "A plan for conveying railway trains across the Straights of Dover". In 1871 he published: "The Science of Modern Cotton Spinning".

Evan Leigh died at his home: Clarence House, Chorlton-on-Medlock after a bout of chronic bronchitis on Wednesday, 2 February 1876 aged 65.

A portrait of Evan Leigh is in the possession of the National Portrait Gallery in London.

== Family ==
He married Anne Allen the daughter of James Allen in Prestbury, Cheshire on 28 September 1831; they went on to have eight surviving children, three boys and five girls. One of his children, Evan Arthur Leigh, also carried out a number of patents. Improvements in a Method and Mechanism for the Manufacture of Worsted Yarns is one of them. It can be assumed that Evan Arthur Leigh carried on the business of cotton spinning.

== Works ==
He wrote a book, The science of modern cotton spinning : embracing mill architecture, machinery for cotton ginning, opening, scutching, preparing, and spinning, with all the latest improvements : also articles on steam and water power, shafting, gearing and American system of belting compared, generation and application of steam criticised and explained, boilers, boiler explosions, &c. ... As said in the title, it is mainly about cotton milling and production.
