= Hathersage =

Village in Derbyshire, England

Coordinates: 53.33°N 1.658°W

- Village and Civil Parish
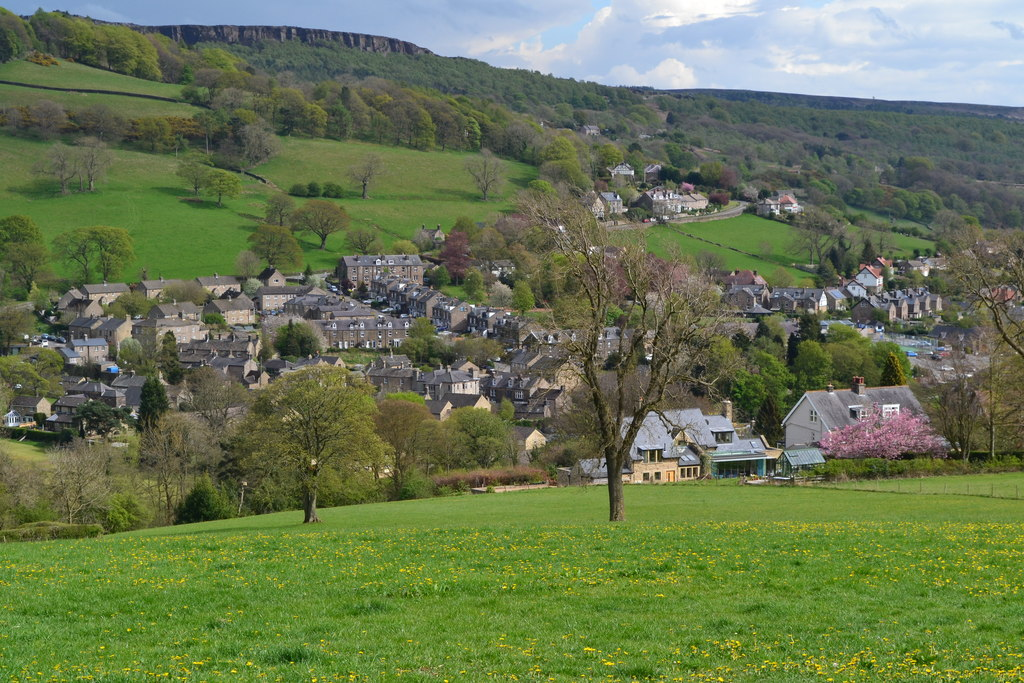
- Overlooking Hathersage

- Location within Derbyshire
- Population: 1,433 (2011 Census)
- OS grid reference: SK229815
- District: Derbyshire Dales
- Shire county: Derbyshire
- Region: East Midlands
- Country: England
- Sovereign state: United Kingdom
- Post town: HOPE VALLEY
- Postcode district: S32
- Dialling code: 01433
- Police: Derbyshire
- Fire: Derbyshire
- Ambulance: East Midlands
- UK Parliament: Derbyshire Dales
- Website: https://hathersageparishcouncil.gov.uk/

Hathersage ( /ˈhæðəsɪdʒ/ HATHə-sidge) is a village and civil parish in the Peak District in Derbyshire, England. It lies slightly to the north of the River Derwent, approximately 10 miles (16.1 km) south-west of Sheffield.

== Toponymy ==
The origin of its name is disputed, although it is generally accepted that the second half derives from the Old English word ecg meaning "edge". In 1086, it was recorded in the Domesday Book as Hereseige and, around 1220, as Hauersegg.

== History ==
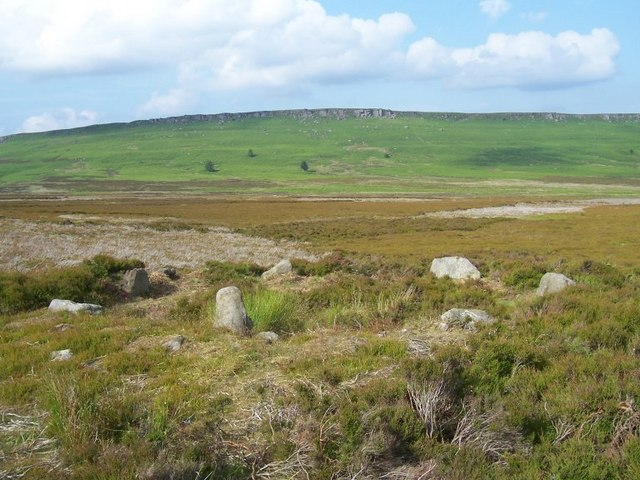
Bronze Age stone circle on Bamford Moor, above Hathersage looking towards Stanage Edge, where Mesolithic microliths were found

=== Pre-history ===
Mesolithic microliths have been found below Stanage Edge, indicating ancient occupation of the area.

In the Outseats area, there is evidence of Bronze Age field system, settlement and burial cairn at Dennis Knoll. Close to a now recumbent 2.3m high boundary marker on Bamford Moor is an embanked stone circle or possibly a ring cairn between 11m and 10m diameter.

=== Roman period ===
There are remains of a Romano-British settlement, possibly a farmstead at a location known as the Warren in the Outseats area. Finds from this site include Roman period pottery and a gritstone quern. An early lead smelting site, variously interpreted as Roman or early Medieval, has been found at Bole Hill.

=== Medieval period ===
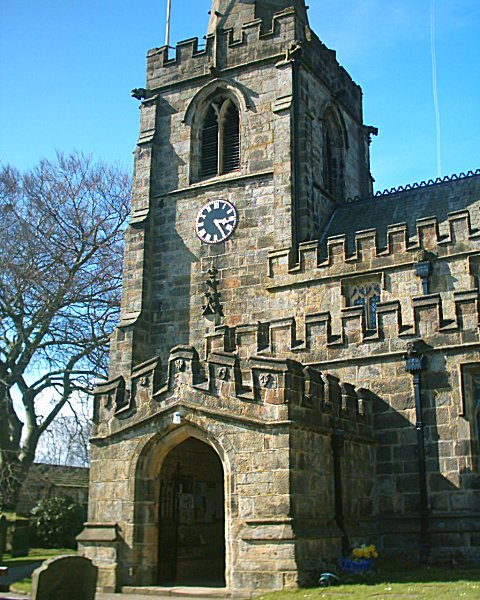
St Michael's Church

The Domesday Book records that, in 1066, Hathersage was held by Leofric and his brother Leofnoth. By 1086, Ralph son of Hubert is listed as both Lord and Tenant-in-chief. The population in 1086 was 8 villagers and 2 smallholders.

The earliest recorded church was built by Richard Bassett, son of Ralph Bassett, Chancellor of England in the reign of Henry I. The present Grade-I-listed structure dates mainly from the late 14th and early 15th centuries. The church, St Michael and All Angels', has a stained-glass window by Charles Kempe, which was removed from Derwent Chapel before it was submerged under the Ladybower Reservoir. Near the church is an earthwork called Camp Green, thought to have been constructed during the Danish occupation. It is also scheduled as a Norman ringwork castle of the 11th/12th century. In the graveyard lies the base and lower shaft of a plain early Saxon cross.

In 1566, Christopher Schutz, a German immigrant, who invented a process for drawing wire, set up a works in Hathersage. This became important in sieves used by miners and later developed into pin and needle production. This led to one of the first Factory Acts, because inhalation of grinding dust resulted in a life expectancy of only thirty years. In the mid-18th century, Hathersage became famous for its brass buttons. Some of the mill buildings from this era have been converted into flats.

In 1728, Daniel Defoe recorded how the moors around Hathersage were the source of building stones and millstones. Millstones were used in wood-pulping industries in the area and were also exported to North America, Russia and Scandinavia for the same purpose. Locally, the millstones were also used for crushing lead ore and the ingredients for paint. In Dorset, Peak stones were used for farm meal and barley crushing. The local gritstone tended to discolour bread, so were not generally used to grind wheat.

=== Industrial Revolution ===
There is evidence of a post-medieval lime kiln, possibly constructed 1830s in the Outseats area. In the 18th century, the village was connected to Sheffield by the Sheffield to Hathersage Turnpike.

== Economy ==
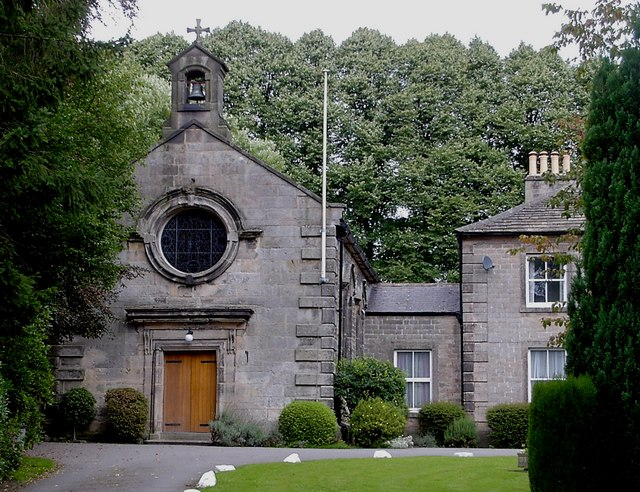
Church of St. Michael the Archangel, Hathersage

Hathersage is a tourist destination because of the scenery of the Hope and Derwent valleys, its literary connections and easy access by train or road from Sheffield and Manchester. Its visitors come to swim (open-air heated swimming pool, with cafe open all year), climb (Stanage Edge, which with other nearby edges have been the nursery for many famous British rock and mountain climbers) or ramble in its river valleys or hillwalk on its open moors. Hathersage Moor is the site of the Carl Wark hillfort and Higger Tor; both are now within the Sheffield boundary.

In 1990, the cutler David Mellor opened the Round Building built on the site of a former gasometer as a cutlery factory in the village. The building was designed by architect Sir Michael Hopkins. In 2007, an extension to the old retort house on the site was opened as a design museum. Mellor's wife, Fiona MacCarthy, continued to live in Hathersage.

Hathersage has two business parks: Hathersage Business Park and Hathersage Hall Business Centre.

Hathersage has three churches, one school and numerous community organisations. There is an annual gala, scarecrow building competition and well dressing in July. On 1 April 2015, Hathersage and Outseats, the two parishes that comprised the village, were replaced by a single new parish council, called Hathersage Parish Council. The population recorded at the 2011 Census was 1,433, although the parish council website says the village has a population of 2,000.

== Transport ==
The village is served by Hathersage railway station on the trans-Pennine Hope Valley Line. Services run generally hourly in both directions between Sheffield and Manchester Piccadilly, operated mainly by Northern Trains.

Hathersage is served by the 271 and 272 bus services on the Sheffield to Castleton route, which are operated by Hulley’s and First South Yorkshire, and by service 257 run by Andrews of Tideswell and South Pennine.

== Education ==
The village is served by Hathersage St Michael's C of E (A) Primary School which offers education from Nursery up to Year 6. The school was rated as 'good' in its November 2016 Ofsted report.

The nearest secondary school is Hope Valley College.

== Cultural references ==
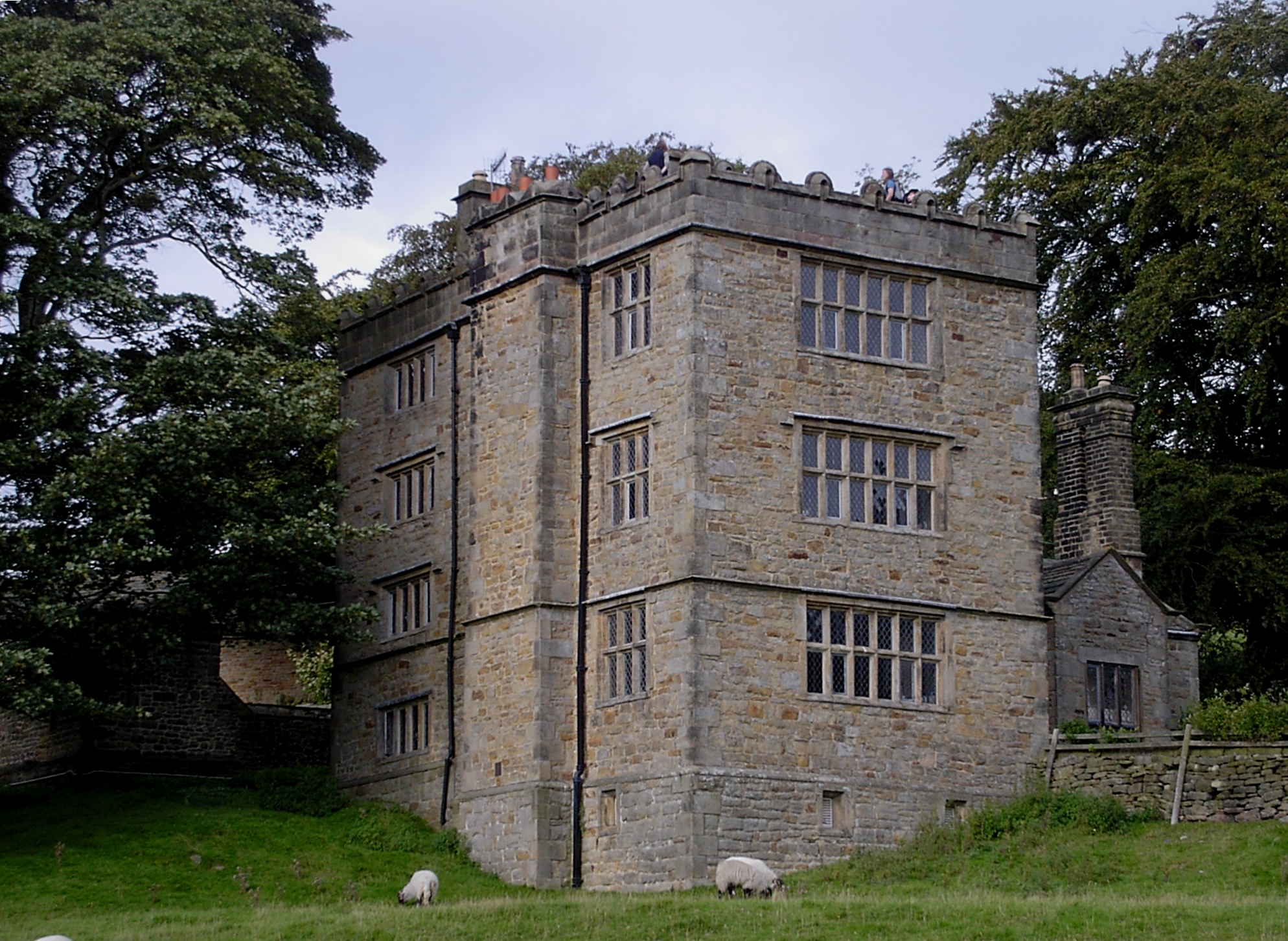
North Lees Hall

Stones in the churchyard mark what is known as the grave of Little John, where in 1780 James Shuttleworth claims to have unearthed a thigh bone measuring 72.39 centimetres (28.50 in). This would have made Little John 8.08 feet (2.46 m) in height. One claimant to Robin Hood "of Locksley" is the village of Loxley, only eight miles over the moors on the edge of Sheffield. A number of local landmarks are associated with Robin Hood, such as Robin Hood's Cross on Abney Moor, Robin Hood's Stoop on Offerton Moor, Hood Brook and Robin Hood’s Cave on Stanage Edge.

In 1845, Charlotte Brontë stayed at the Hathersage vicarage, visiting her friend Ellen Nussey, whose brother was the vicar, while she was writing Jane Eyre. Many of the locations mentioned in her novel match locations in Hathersage, the name Eyre being that of a family of the local gentry. Her "Thornfield Hall" is accepted as being based on North Lees Hall, on the outskirts of Hathersage.

Some of the scenes of the horror film Let Sleeping Corpses Lie (1974, directed by Jorge Grau, also known as The Living Dead at Manchester Morgue) were shot at St. Michael's Church in Hathersage.

== Sport ==
Hathersage is home to Hathersage F.C. who currently compete in the Hope Valley Amateur League.

Hathersage Cricket Club and ground is based on Baulk Lane, Hathersage. The club have three senior teams: a 1st and 2nd XI that compete in the Yorkshire and Derbyshire Cricket League and a Friendly Sunday XI. The club also have an active junior training section that play league cricket in the North Derbyshire Youth Cricket League.

The Fat Boys Stanage Struggle is a popular local fell race that starts in Hathersage, altitude 91 metres (299 ft), and routes up to and along Stanage Edge to High Neb, 458 metres (1,503 ft), before returning to the village 367 metres (1,204 ft) below.

== Notable people ==
- James Holworthy (1781–1841), watercolour artist, his art can be seen in the Tate Gallery.
- George Wilson (1808–1870), political activist, chairman of the Anti-Cornlaw League.
- Lizzie Ball (born 1981) musician, concert producer, violinist, vocalist, and advisor on musical and theatrical projects.

== See also ==
- Listed buildings in Hathersage
