= List of crossings of the River Derwent, Derbyshire =

This is a list of crossings of the Derbyshire Derwent, the principal river of Derbyshire in the Midlands of England.

Listed in the table are those crossings that have been identified from the first formal crossing at the packhorse bridge at Slippery Stones, in the upper Derwent valley, continuing through the Derwent Valley Mills heritage site to Derby, to the last crossing near Church Wilne upstream of Derwent Mouth where the Derwent meets the River Trent.

Described by Defoe in 1726 as a "fury of a river" the Derwent could only be forded at a number of particular locations, which could still be impassable during winter floods. Wooden bridges provided for a more reliable crossing, but were easily damaged by those same floods. The wooden bridge at Leadmill was destroyed before it was completed in the early 1700s. Toad-Moor Bridge near Ambergate was rebuilt as Halfpenny Bridge by Francis Hurt in 1792, after being swept away in a flood of 1791. In the Candlemas flood of February 1795, the bridges at Belper and Whatstandwell were washed away, but were subsequently rebuilt soon after.

Glover in his History of the County of Derby of 1829 noted that there were a number of bridges, fords and a ferry across the Derwent. There were fords at Wilne Mills, Alvaston, Little Eaton and Ambaston, and a ferry at Matlock Bath. Wooden bridges were mentioned at Wilne Mills, Borrowash Mills and Exeter Bridge, downstream of which was a long wooden bridge for canal towing horses. Tolls were levied at Wilne Mills, Darley Abbey, and Milford, where there was also a chain-bridge for mill workers. He also recorded a number of county bridges and stone-arched bridges, the majority of which are now listed structures, and in some cases scheduled monuments. A number of these bridges were built by the local industrial families of the Derwent valley, including those of Hurt, Strutt and Evans.

== Crossings ==
Key to heritage status
Status	Criteria
I	Grade I listed. Bridge of exceptional interest, sometimes considered to be internationally important
II*	Grade II* listed. Particularly important bridge of more than special interest
II	Grade II listed. Bridge of national importance and special interest
SM	Scheduled Monument. Nationally important archaeological bridge.

River order	Name	Image	Location Coordinates	Carries	Date	Heritage status	Notes
1	Slippery Stones packhorse bridge		Hope Woodlands; 53.45260°N 1.74661°W	Footpath	1672 (1959)	II	A 17th-century packhorse bridge that was relocated from Derwent village
2	Howden Dam		Howden Reservoir; 53.43333°N 1.75000°W	–	1912	II	For information
3	Derwent Dam		Derwent Reservoir; 53.40503°N 1.74167°W	–	1916	II	For information
4	Fairholmes Bridge		Derwent Reservoir; 53.40260°N 1.74219°W	Derwent Lane		-	Stone arch bridge
5	Ashopton Viaduct		Ladybower Reservoir; 53.37465°N 1.71147°W	A57	1943	-	Concrete viaduct
6	Ladybower Dam		Ladybower Reservoir; 53.3657°N 1.7011°W	Footpath	1943	-	Footway along dam wall
7	Yorkshire Bridge		Yorkshire Bridge; 53.36123°N 1.70386°W	Lydgate Lane	1800s	II	Stone arch bridge
8	Bamford Mill footbridge		Bamford; 53.34659°N 1.69411°W	Footpath		-	Wooden footbridge at Bamford Mill
9	Water Lane bridge		Bamford; 53.34284°N 1.69273°W	Water Lane		-	Minor road bridge
10	Railway bridge		Bamford; 53.34014°N 1.69230°W	Hope Valley Line		-	Rail bridge
11	Mytham Bridge		Bamford; 53.33917°N 1.69388°W	A6187		-	Stone arch bridge with adjacent footbridge
12	Hathersage stepping stones		Hathersage; 53.33048°N 1.67540°W	Footpath		-	Between Offerton and Hathersage
13	Leadmill Bridge		Hathersage; 53.32187°N 1.65102°W	B6001	18th century	II	Stone arch bridge – widened in 1928
14	Grindleford Bridge		Grindleford; 53.29675°N 1.63415°W	B6251		II & SM	Stone arch bridge
15	Froggatt Bridge		Froggatt; 53.28116°N 1.63585°W	Minor Road	19th century	SM	Stone arch bridge
16	Froggatt New Bridge		Froggatt; 53.27445°N 1.63565°W	A625		-	Stone arch bridge
17	Calver Bridge		Calver; 53.26657°N 1.63146°W	Minor road	19th century	II*	Triple arched stone bridge
18	Calver Bridge (A623)		Calver; 53.26625°N 1.63206°W	A623	1974	-	Modern bridge
19	Baslow Bridge		Baslow; 53.24775°N 1.62527°W	Minor road	1608	I & SM	Stone arch bridge with toll booth
20	Devonshire Bridge		Baslow; 53.24604°N 1.62337°W	A619	1925	-	Bakewell Road bridge
21	Chatsworth Park Bridge		Chatsworth; 53.22800°N 1.61622°W	Minor road	1774	I	Designed by James Paine, providing access to Chatsworth House
22	One Arch Bridge		Chatsworth; 53.21241°N 1.61106°W	B6012	1760	II* & SM	Also designed by James Paine, linking Edensor to Beeley
23	Rowsley Viaduct		Rowsley; 53.19038°N 1.61842°W	Unused	1862	-	Former railway viaduct
24	Rowsley Bridge		Rowsley; 53.18957°N 1.61720°W	A6	15th century	II* & SM	Stone arch bridge widened 1926
25	Darley Bridge		Darley Bridge; 53.15508°N 1.59697°W	B5057	15th century	II* & SM	Stone arch bridge
26	Peak Rail bridge		Matlock; 53.14200°N 1.56899°W	Peak Rail		-	Bridge 35
27	Derwent Way bridge		Matlock; 53.14074°N 1.56464°W	A6	2007	-	Modern A6 bridge
28	Matlock Bridge		Matlock; 53.13788°N 1.55622°W	Former A6 route restored and widened 1904	15th century	II* & SM	Stone arch bridge
29	Hall Leys Park footbridge		Matlock; 53.13659°N 1.55414°W	Footpath		-	The gateway to the bridge shows flood heights in 1960 and 1965
30	Railway bridge		Matlock; 53.13486°N 1.55643°W	Derwent Valley Line		-	Rail bridge
31	Footbridge		Matlock; 53.13333°N 1.55684°W	Footpath		-	Dale Road to Pic Tor
32	Footbridge		Matlock Bath; 53.12600°N 1.55975°W	Footpath		-	Dale Road to High Tor
33	Footbridge		Matlock Bath; 53.12386°N 1.55791°W	Footpath		-	Dale Road to cable car
34	Matlock Bath Bridge		Matlock Bath; 53.12189°N 1.55786°W	Access road		-	Access road to Station Yard
35	Jubilee Bridge, Matlock Bath		Matlock Bath; 53.12142°N 1.56154°W	Footpath	1887	-	Footbridge
36	Derwent Gardens footbridge		Matlock Bath; 53.11752°N 1.55990°W	Footpath	1969	-	Modern footbridge linking Derwent Gardens to Lovers Walk; site of earlier Matlock ferry
37	Cromford Bridge		Cromford; 53.11101°N 1.55310°W	Mill Road	15th century	II* & SM	Stone arch bridge
38	Cromford railway bridge		Cromford; 53.11206°N 1.54809°W	Derwent Valley Line		-	Rail bridge
39	Access bridge (High peak junction)		High Peak Junction; 53.10074°N 1.53171°W	Access road		-	Access to sewage works
40	Footbridge		High Peak Junction; 53.10060°N 1.53127°W	Footpath		-	High Peak Junction
41	Leawood railway bridge		High Peak Junction; 53.09778°N 1.52882°W	Derwent Valley Line		-	Rail bridge
42	Wigwell Aqueduct		High Peak Junction; 53.09693°N 1.52983°W	Cromford Canal	1790s	SM	Partially collapsed during construction; rebuilt at William Jessop's own expense
43	Railway bridge		High Peak Junction; 53.09595°N 1.52191°W	Derwent Valley Line		-	Rail bridge
44	Homesford footbridge		Whatstandwell; 53.09447°N 1.51415°W	Footpath		-	Combined foot and pipe bridge
45	Railway bridge		Whatstandwell; 53.08979°N 1.50692°W	Derwent Valley Line		-	Rail bridge
46	Whatstandwell Bridge		Whatstandwell; 53.08549°N 1.50704°W	A6	1796	II	Stone arch bridge
47	Oak Hurst mills bridge		Ambergate; 53.06674°N 1.49193°W	Access road		-	Access bridge
48	Halfpenny Bridge		Ambergate; 53.05942°N 1.48389°W	Holly Lane	1792	II	Also known as Toad-Moor bridge, built as a toll bridge by Francis Hurt
49	Derwent Viaduct		Ambergate; 53.05672°N 1.48288°W	Midland Main Line	1840	II*	Skewed rail bridge
50	Railway bridge		Belper; 53.0458°N 1.4849°W	Midland Main Line		-	Rail bridge
51	Railway bridge		Belper; 53.0321°N 1.4830°W	Midland Main Line		-	Rail bridge
52	Belper Bridge		Belper; 53.02936°N 1.48725°W	Bridge Foot	1798	II	Tripled arched bridge
53	Belper Meadows footbridge		Belper; 53.02505°N 1.49173°W	Footpath		-	Access bridge
54	Belper sewage works bridge		Belper; 53.01619°N 1.48501°W	Access road		-	Access bridge
55	Swainsley Railway bridge		Belper; 53.01125°N 1.48433°W	Midland Main Line		-	Steel rail bridge
56	Milford Bridge		Milford; 53.00231°N 1.47840°W	A6	1790	II	Stone arch bridge
57	Milford footbridge		Milford; 53.00096°N 1.47936°W	Footpath		-	Garden centre access
58	Moscow Farm bridge		Milford; 52.99587°N 1.48139°W	Access road		-	Access bridge
59	Duffield Church Bridge		Duffield; 52.98290°N 1.47961°W	Makeney Road	Probable 16th century	II & SM	Stone arch bridge
60	Burley Railway Bridge		Little Eaton; 52.96981°N 1.47143°W	Midland Main Line		-	Rail bridge
61	Allestree Ford Bridge		Allestree; 52.95760°N 1.46619°W	Ford Lane		-	Former ford at this point
62	Allestree A38 Bridge		Allestree; 52.95568°N 1.46759°W	Abbey Hill		-	Dual carriageway bridge
63	Darley Abbey toll bridge		Darley Abbey; 52.94332°N 1.47584°W	Haslams Lane		-	The existing toll bridge was deemed unsafe for both foot and road traffic in 2022, and was subsequently replaced by a temporary pedestrian footbridge known as Walter's Walkway later that same year.
64	Handyside Bridge		Derby; 52.93092°N 1.47747°W	Footpath	1878	II	Former GNR railway bridge
65	St Marys Bridge		Derby; 52.92716°N 1.47519°W	Minor road	1793	II* & SM	Designed by Thomas Harrison, it replaced an earlier medieval bridge; adjacent is St Mary's Bridge Chapel.
66	Causey Bridge		Derby; 52.92667°N 1.47521°W	Saint Alkmunds Way	1972	-	Dual carriageway bridge
67	Cathedral Green Footbridge		Derby; 52.92525°N 1.47522°W	Footpath	2009	-	Swing bridge
68	Exeter Bridge		Derby; 52.92397°N 1.47382°W	Derwent Street	1929	-	1920s road bridge, replaced earlier wooden bridge
69	Holmes Bridge		Derby; 52.92343°N 1.46968°W	A601	1972	-	Dual carriageway bridge
70	Bass Recreation Ground footbridge		Derby; 52.92139°N 1.46592°W	Footpath		-	Modern footbridge
71	Derwent Bridge		Derby; 52.91952°N 1.46376°W	Midland Main Line	1840	II	Skewed rail bridge, also known as Five Arches
72	Derwent Parade bridge		Pride Park; 52.91761°N 1.44309°W	Derwent Parade		-	Modern road bridge
73	Railway bridge Pride Park		Pride Park; 52.91104°N 1.44067°W	Midland Main Line		-	Midland Main Line
74	Raynesway Bridge		Derby; 52.90467°N 1.43049°W	A5111	1938	-	A5111
75	Waste Incinerator bridge		Derby; 52.90440°N 1.42760°W	Access road		-	Access to incinerator
76	Fernhook Avenue bridge		Derby; 52.90280°N 1.41177°W	Access road	2009	-	Access to Derby commercial park
77	Access bridge		Borrowash; 52.90161°N 1.39012°W	Access road		-	Borrowash
78	Borrowash Bridge		Borrowash; 52.90162°N 1.38411°W	B5010		-	Links Borrowash to Elvaston
79	Ambaston Ford		Ambaston; 52.89325°N 1.36010°W	Disused		-	Disused ford between Ambaston and Nooning Lane
80	Wilne footbridge		Church Wilne; 52.87868°N 1.32974°W	Footpath	1960s	-	Replaced earlier toll bridge upstream at Wilne mills
81	Derwent Mouth		Great Wilne; 52.87291°N 1.31980°W	–		-	Confluence with the Trent

== Bibliography ==
- Philip's (1997). Street Atlas – Derbyshire. Philip's. ISBN 0-540-06138-7.
- Glover, Stephen (1829). Noble, Thomas (ed.). The History of the County of Derby. Mozley.
- Cooper, Brian (1983). Transformation of a Valley: The Derbyshire Derwent (New, Scarthin 1997 Reprint ed.). London: Heinemann. ISBN 0-907758-17-7.
