= Exeter House =

Coordinates: 52°55′27″N 1°28′20″W

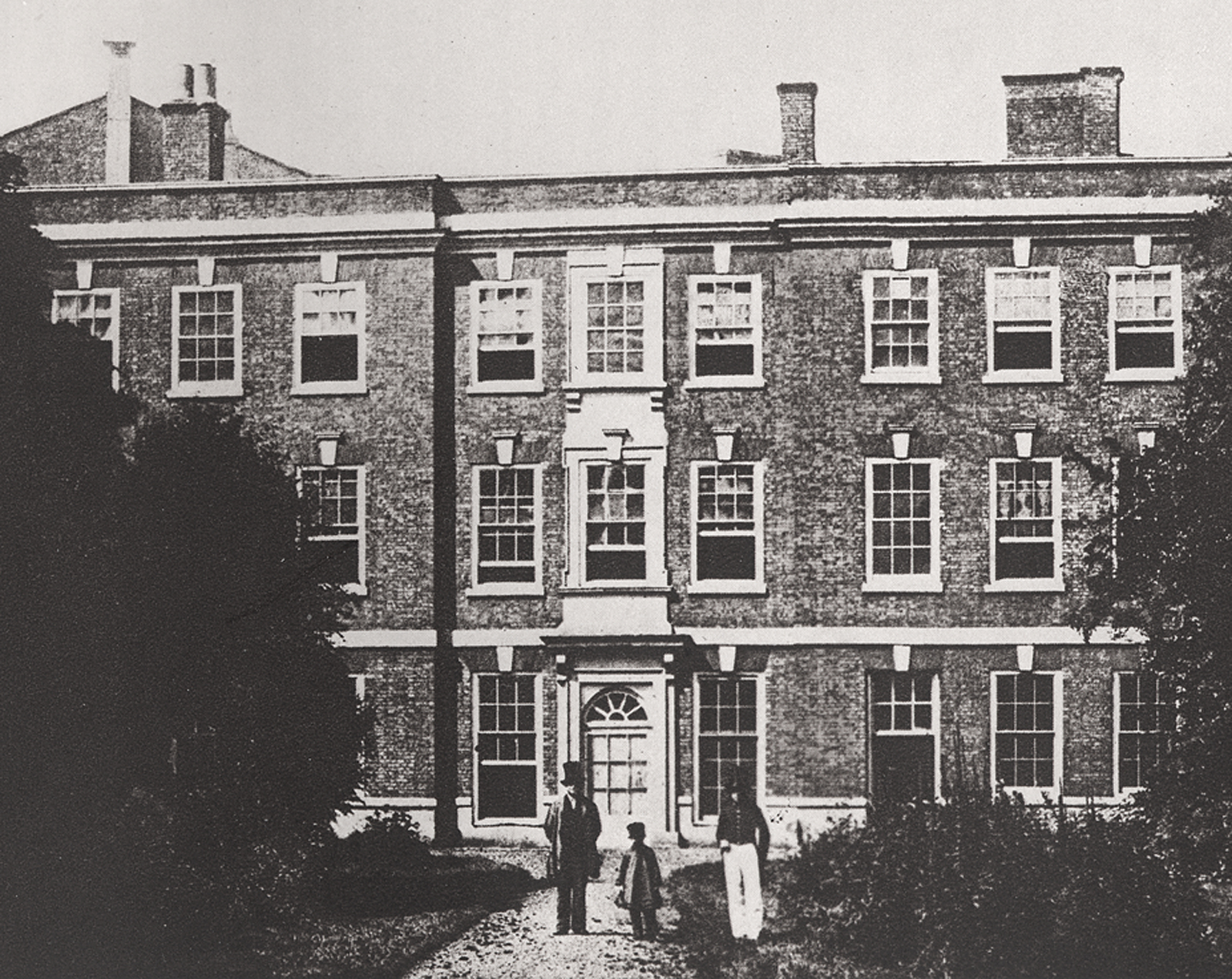
Exeter House in 1853

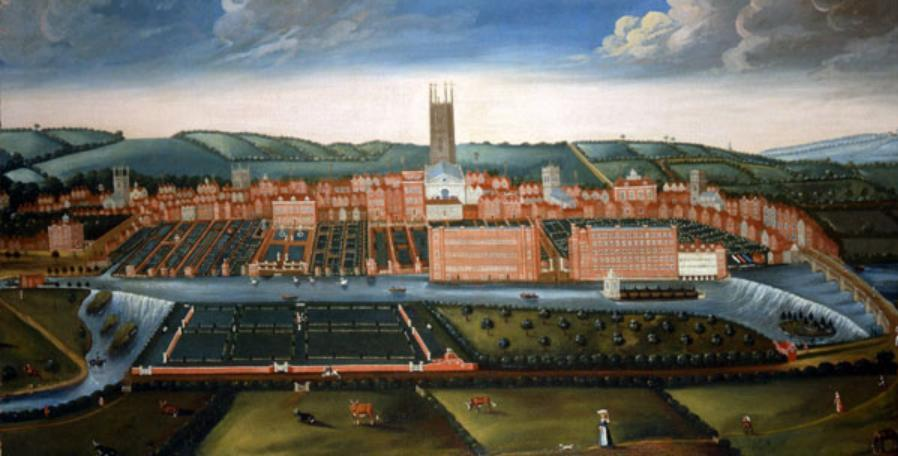
A Prospect of Derby (c. 1725) shows Exeter House mid left

Exeter House was an early 17th-century brick-built mansion, which stood in Full Street, Derby until 1854. Named for the Earls of Exeter, whose family owned the property until 1757, the house was notable for the stay of Charles Edward Stuart during the Jacobite rising of 1745. Exeter House was replaced by offices, which in turn were replaced by Charles Herbert Aslin's Magistrates' Courts, built on the site during 1935. The courts were closed at the beginning of 2004, and after a decade, the vacant building returned to use as an office development, Riverside Chambers.

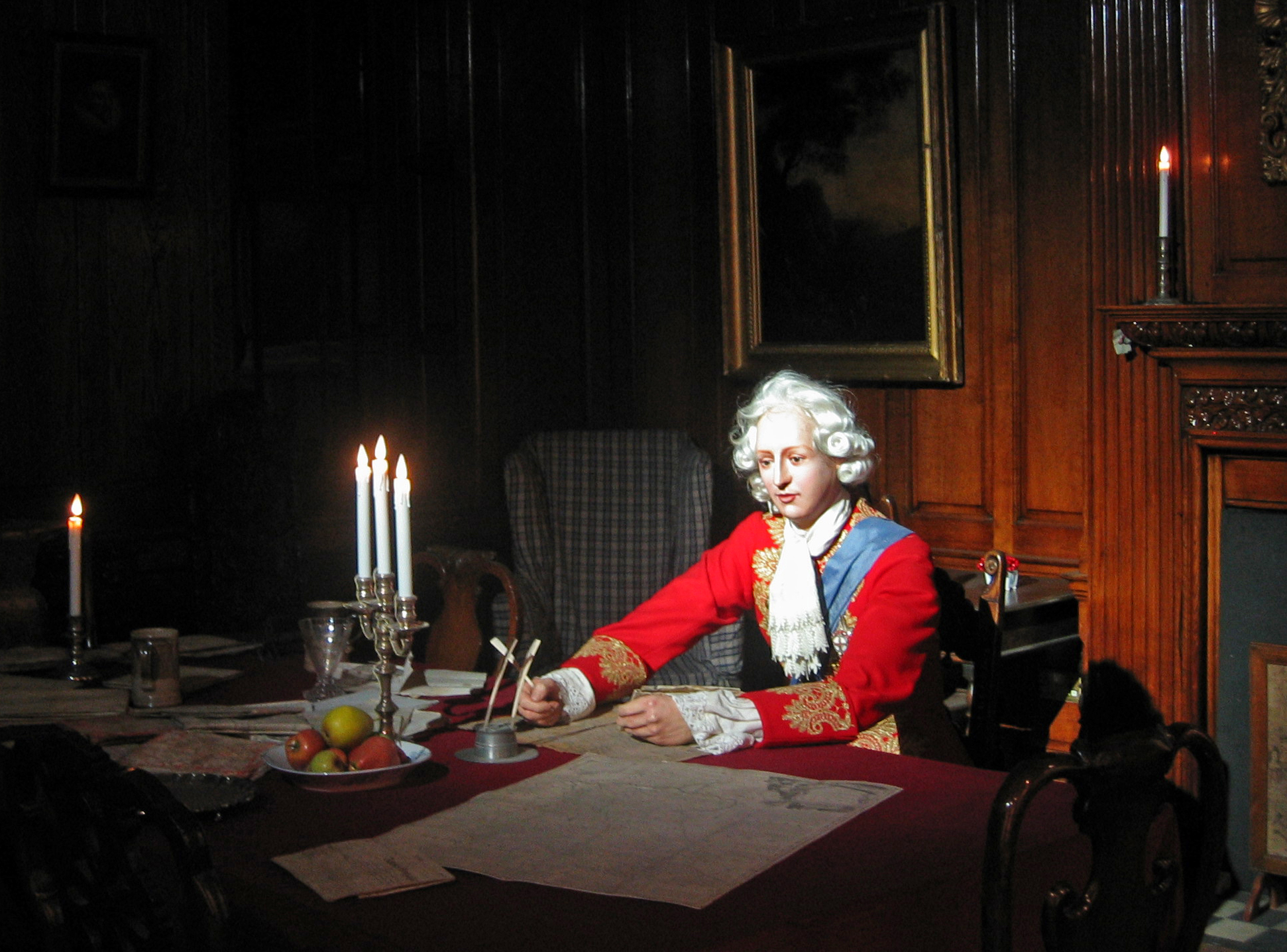
A room from Exeter House in Derby Museum and Art Gallery

This is where Charles Edward Stuart ("Bonnie Prince Charlie" or "the Young Pretender") stayed, 4–6 December 1745. He dined with a widow, Mrs Ward; her son, Samuel Ward (born 1732) acted as a food taster for the Young Pretender.

On the morning of 5 December, a council of war was called at Exeter House. The commander of the prince's forces, Lord George Murray, argued that the lack of support from the French and from English Jacobites made success unlikely and retreat necessary. The prince was opposed to a retreat, and some members of the council objected strongly to giving up their advance on London. Meeting with the council again later in the day, the prince took the decision to retreat, and he left Exeter House the following morning. He gave Ward's mother a diamond ring in thanks for their service before he left. The decision to retreat meant that the Young Pretender would not take George II's crown, and his army returned to Scotland, where they were finally defeated in 1746 at the Battle of Culloden.

After the death of the 8th Earl of Exeter in 1754, the house was sold in 1757 by his widow to John Bingham, Mayor of Derby for that year. Bingham lived at the house until his death in 1773 after which, in 1795, Jedediah Strutt purchased it. Strutt lived there until his death in 1797. The last owner was a lawyer, William Eaton Mousely, twice Mayor of Derby, who, after making some alterations in the 1830s, had the house demolished in 1854, believing Exeter House to be too large to maintain, and also to allow improvements to Exeter Bridge. A timber footbridge had been built by the Binghams of Exeter House to access their gardens on the other side of the River Derwent.

On visiting Exeter House in 1839, Lord Stanhope noted the drawing room on the first floor, the room in which the final council of war was held, as being "…unaltered, it is all over wainscotted with ancient oak, very dark and handsome…". It was reached by a dark oak staircase, with carved balustrades. Another visitor, Mrs. Thomson, described the house as standing back from Full Street within a small rectangular court. The wide staircase ascended from a small hall to the drawing room; on either side of the drawing room were small panelled rooms, which had served as the bedrooms for the prince and his officers. A spacious drawing room on the ground floor (altered by Mousely) gave access to a long garden, enclosed between high walls, which led down to the riverside.

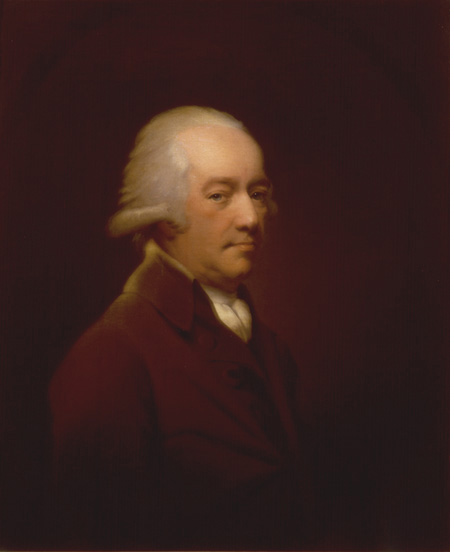
Samuel Ward (1781) by Joseph Wright of Derby

Mousely had intended to sell off the panelling from the house in separate lots. However, an appeal by the MP for Derby Michael Thomas Bass, the Earl of Chesterfield and William Bemrose among others persuaded Mousely to call off the sales. The panelling of the drawing room was instead removed to the cellars of the Derby Assembly Rooms. It was later reassembled within the Derby Museum and Art Gallery when the museum opened in 1879. In 2021 the exhibition of the Exeter Room in Derby was reconfigured, and the mannequin of the prince was gifted to the Battle of Prestonpans [1745] Heritage Trust which displays it in the Museum & Jacobite Heritage Centre at Prestonpans Town Hall.

Blue plaque on the outside wall of the court building

Below is an extract from Stephen Glover's History of Derby (1843):

Exeter House, the mansion house which communicates with the Full Street, from its connection with the history of this county, in the year 1745. At that time it belonged to the Earl of Exeter, and Prince Charles Edward, commonly designated "the Young Pretender," took up his abode there, and held his Council of War in a fine old oak wainscoted room (now used as a drawing-room) before he determined to abandon his project. This house was subsequently occupied by an ancestor of the late celebrated William Strutt, esq., and by other families, and is now the residence of William Eaton Mousley, esq., to whom it belongs.
