= Exeter Bridge =

Exeter Bridge - Derby
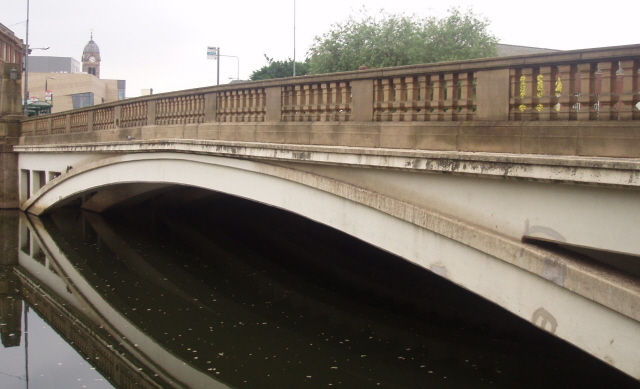
- Looking toward the Market Place
- Coordinates: 52.9238°N 1.4738°W
- Carries: Traffic
- Crosses: River Derwent
- Locale: Derbyshire
- Maintained by: Derby City Council

Characteristics
- Design: Road bridge
- Total length: 50 metres
- Width: 15 metres
- Height: 10 metres

History
- Designer: Charles Herbert Aslin
- Construction start: August 1927
- Opened: 20 March 1929

Statistics
- Daily traffic: 3,000 (2009 estimates)
- Toll: Free

Location
- Interactive map of Exeter Bridge - Derby

Exeter Bridge is a bridge in the centre of Derby spanning the River Derwent 200 metres south of the more modern Cathedral Green Footbridge.

== History ==
Derby's original Exeter Bridge started life as a timber footbridge built by the Binghams of Exeter House, in order to access their gardens on the other side of the River Derwent. Exeter House was eventually demolished because of cost and to allow improvements to the bridge to be made.

The old Exeter Bridge was demolished in 1929 and replaced by a single-span concrete bridge designed by Charles Herbert Aslin of the City Architect's Department, who was also responsible for Derby's now demolished Art Deco-style bus station. During construction a test was carried out to see if it would hold the weight of the traffic. Civil engineers ran a procession of traction engines, steam rollers and heavy lorries across the bridge to check it could take the strain. It was officially opened by the minister of transport, Herbert Morrison on 13 March 1931.

Exeter Bridge features bas relief sculptures of:

- John Lombe, founder of the Silk Mill Museum, one of England's first modern factories, now a World Heritage site.
- William Hutton, who worked at the Silk Mill as a child before becoming a bookseller and writing the first published history of Derby in 1791.
- Herbert Spencer, born in Exeter Street, best known for coining the concept "survival of the fittest", which he did in Principles of Biology (1864), after reading Charles Darwin's On the Origin of Species.
- Erasmus Darwin, physician, botanist and poet; Darwin lived in Derby for the last 20 years of his life, dying at Breadsall Priory. Like Hutton he was a radical thinker, supporting the American Revolution.
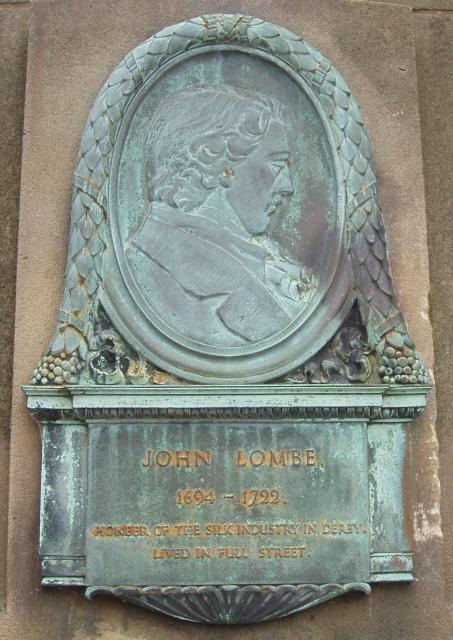
John Lombe

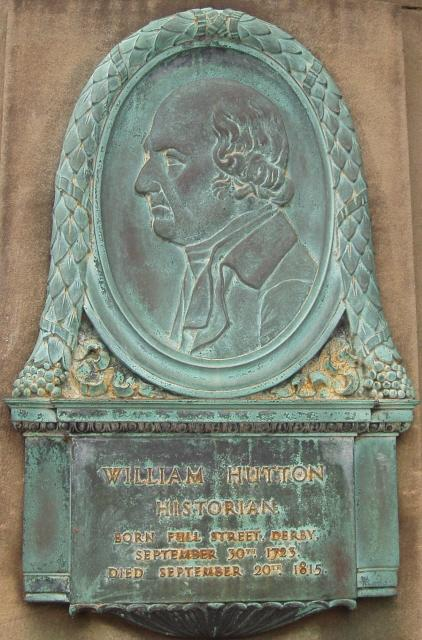
William Hutton

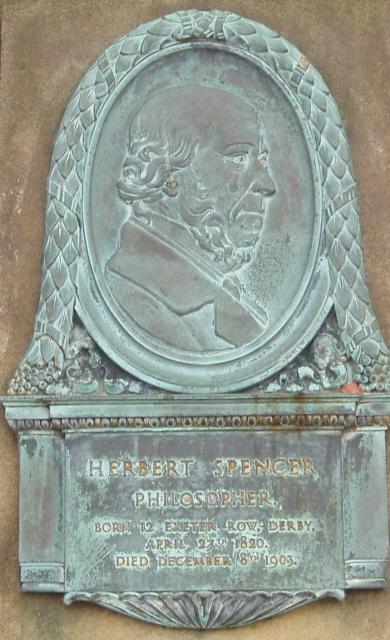
Herbert Spencer

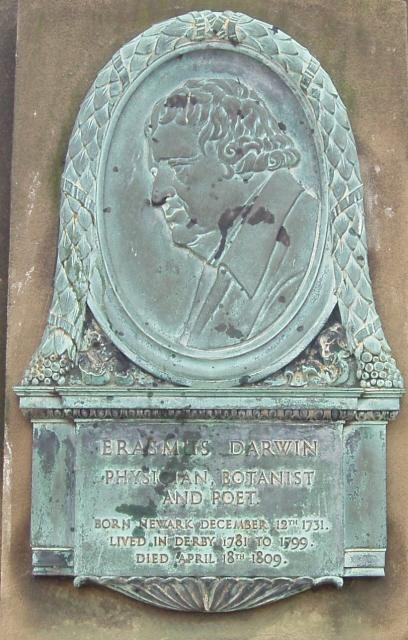
Erasmus Darwin

The sculptures were cast in Cheltenham by H.H. Martyn & Co.

== See also ==
- List of crossings of the River Derwent, Derbyshire
