= Listed buildings in Froggatt, Derbyshire =

Froggatt is a civil parish in the Derbyshire Dales district of Derbyshire, England. The parish contains eight listed buildings that are recorded in the National Heritage List for England. All the listed buildings are designated at Grade II, the lowest of the three grades, which is applied to "buildings of national importance and special interest". The parish contains the village of Froggatt and the surrounding area. Other than a bridge over the River Derwent, the listed buildings are houses, farmhouses, cottages and associated structures.

== Buildings ==
Name and location	Photograph	Date	Notes
Froggatt Bridge; 53.28119°N 1.63583°W		Late 18th century	The bridge, which carries a road over the River Derwent, was refashioned in the 19th century. It is in gritstone, and consists of two unequal arches. The earlier arch to the southwest is round, the later arch is pointed, and between them is a pointed cutwater. The arches have a dentilled band, and the parapets are rusticated and channelled, with massive chamfered copings, and they end in low square piers with pyramidal caps.
Derwent Farmhouse; 53.28226°N 1.63660°W	—	Early 18th century	The farmhouse, which was later extended, is in gritstone with quoins and a stone slate roof. There are two storeys and six bays, the left bay projecting with a coped gable, kneelers and a finial, and the right bay gabled and with the upper floor jettied on corbels. The original doorway has a bracketed hood, and the later doorway in the right bay with a plain surround. The windows are mullioned and contain casements.
Bridge Foot Farmhouse; 53.28149°N 1.63572°W		Mid 18th century	The farmhouse, which was later extended, is in gritstone with quoins and a stone slate roof. There are two storeys and three bays, the right bay an addition. The doorway has massive jambs and a heavy lintel, the windows in the original part are mullioned with two lights, and those in the addition have single lights.
Kray Cottage and 4 Chapel Row; 53.28306°N 1.63602°W		Mid 18th century	A pair of gritstone cottages with quoins and a stone slate roof. There are two storeys, two bays, and a single-story rear outshut. The two doorways have massive frames, the doorway to the right with a hood mould, and the windows are mullioned, each containing three casements.
Rose Cottage and wall 53.28312°N 1.63630°W	—	Mid 18th century	The cottage, which was extended to the rear in the 20th century, is in gritstone with quoins and a stone slate roof. There are two storeys, three bays, and a rear extension. The doorway has a massive frame, and a gabled canopy on carved wooden brackets. There is one single-light window, and the other windows are mullioned and contain two casements. The front garden is enclosed by a wall of vertically-set flagstones.
Stoke View; 53.28328°N 1.63640°W		Mid 18th century	A gritstone cottage with a stone slate roof, two storeys, a T-shaped plan, and three bays. The central doorway has a massive surround, and the windows are casements, some with single lights, and the others mullioned with two lights.
Craig Cottage; 53.28369°N 1.63191°W	—	Early 19th century	The house, which incorporates earlier elements, is in gritstone with a tile roof. There are two storeys and two bays. The central doorway has a massive surround, and the windows are mullioned and transomed with casements.
Toll Bar Cottage; 53.27800°N 1.63375°W		Early 19th century	A former toll house, it is in gritstone with quoins and a stone slate roof. There is a single storey and four bays, the right bay rendered and gabled, and two single-bay rear wings. The original doorway has a massive surround and has been converted into a window, and the other windows are casements, some mullioned.
