= Derwent House, Matlock =

Country house in Matlock, Derbyshire, England

Coordinates: 53°08′05″N 1°33′02″W

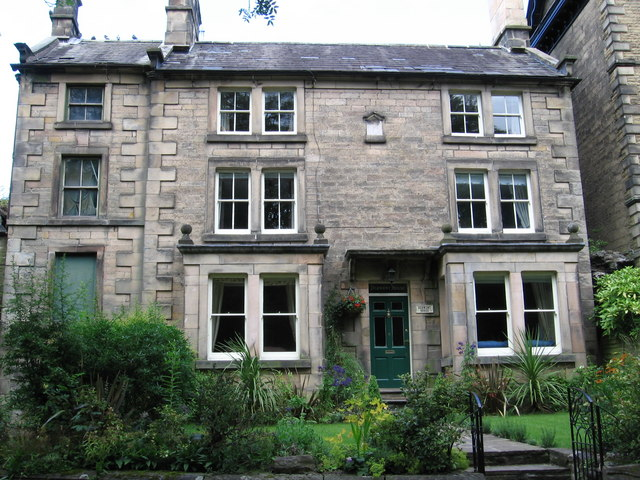
Derwent House

Derwent House is a historic building in Matlock in Derbyshire, England, originally the home of the important Knowles family in the 17th century. The original estate included several buildings surrounding what is now known as Derwent House, including one which is believed to be one of the oldest buildings in Matlock, dating from circa 1670, predated only by the bridge over the River Derwent.

Hall Leys Park is built on land bequeathed by the Knowles family to the parish of Matlock in 1898. Derwent House has been run as a guest house since the mid-20th century. On 26 October 1972 it became a Grade II listed building.
