= Catherine Hutton =

British writer (1756–1846)

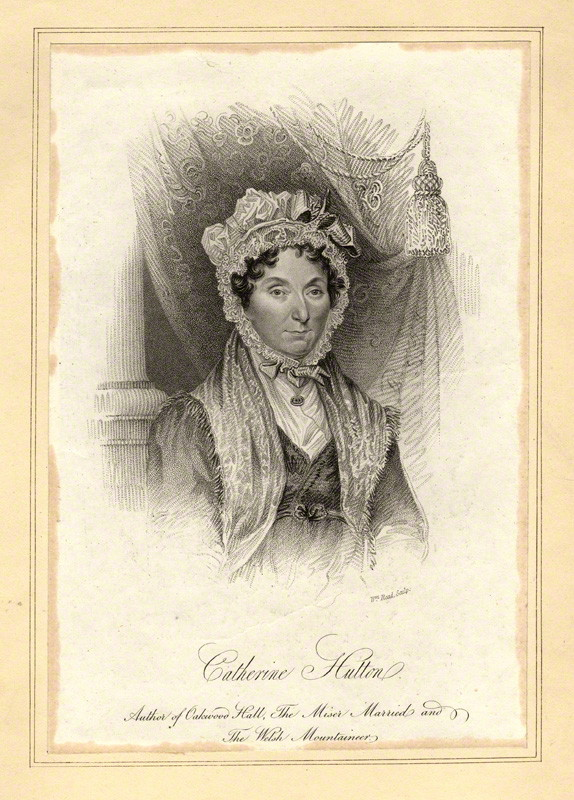
Catherine Hutton in 1824

Catherine Hutton (11 February 1756 – 13 March 1846) was an English novelist and letter-writer.

Born in Birmingham, the daughter of historian William Hutton, Hutton became a friend of the scientist and discoverer of oxygen Joseph Priestley and the novelist Robert Bage. A keen letter-writer, she corresponded with, among others, Charles Dickens, Edward Bulwer-Lytton and her mathematician cousin Charles Hutton. She built up a collection of over two thousand letters, some of which were published after her death.

Hutton published a number of novels including The Miser Married: a Novel (1813) - itself partly written as a series of letters - The Welsh Mountaineer (1817) and Oakwood Hall (1819). She also wrote a history of the Queens of England and numerous pieces of journalism.
