= Cathedral Green Footbridge =

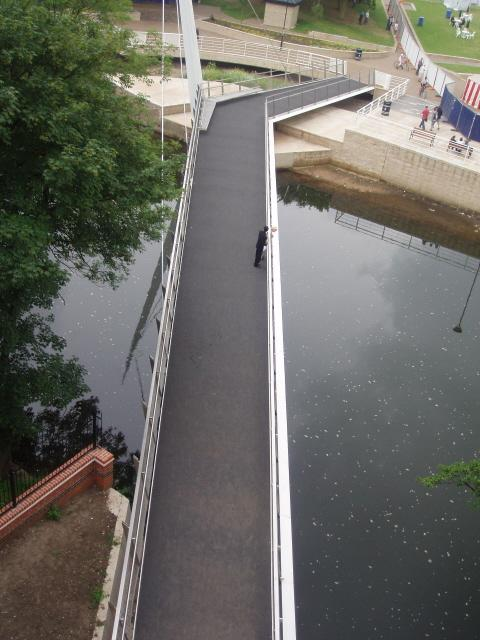
- Coordinates: 52.9252°N 1.4755°W
- Carries: Pedestrians and cycles
- Crosses: River Derwent
- Locale: Derbyshire
- Maintained by: Derby City Council

Characteristics
- Design: Swing Bridge
- Total length: 80 metres
- Width: 5 metres
- Height: 30 metres

History
- Construction start: August 2007
- Opened: 20 March 2009

Statistics
- Daily traffic: 1,000 (2009 estimates)
- Toll: Free

The Cathedral Green Footbridge is a pedestrian and cycle swing bridge in the centre of Derby, spanning the River Derwent. It forms a third side to a triangle between The Cathedral and the Silk Mill Museum.

The bridge and adjacent re-landscaped Cathedral Green opened in March 2009 at a cost of £4.2m and is located in an area of World Heritage status. It links the Cathedral Green to Stuart Street and has been designed to swing to one side when water levels are high. It weighs 95 tonnes, with a box steel section deck, supported by three cables, keeping the overall structural slender. The bridge swings on a pintle bearing, with a central wheel to support its weight.

Construction began in August 2007 and the Bridge opened to the public on 20 March 2009, then was officially opened on 2 April 2009, a year behind schedule, by the Mayor of Derby. The bridge, designed by Ramboll, was partly inspired by tailor's shears and has an iconic needle-shaped mast, to echo the heritage of the nearby Silk Mill. The silk theme of the needle is complemented by the nearby Saint Alkmunds Way Footbridge which includes silk bobbins as its design feature.

The Cathedral Green has landscaped gardens with a tiled pavement incorporating lighting effects, called The Mill Flume, designed by Nayan Kulkarni, representing the path the river took when it powered the waterwheel of the Silk Mill. There is a statue of Bonnie Prince Charlie, as he was billeted near the site of the bridge during the Jacobite rising in December 1745.

The bridge was a finalist in the Prime Minister's Award for better public buildings following its completion in 2009. The judges said they were impressed by the design allowing the bridge to be turned with only a small amount of energy. The bridge, with its 38 degree kink, is supported on the central wheel with a wheel system being used on the counterweighted section.

== See also ==
- List of crossings of the River Derwent, Derbyshire
