= Froggatt, Derbyshire =

Village and civil parish in Derbyshire, England

Coordinates: 53.2833°N 1.6333°W

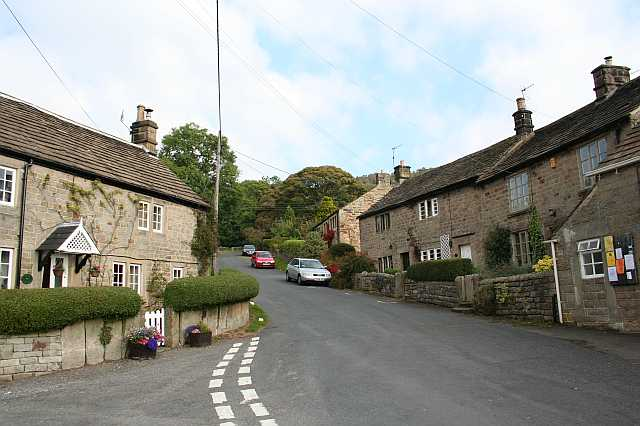

- Location within Derbyshire
- Population: 185 (2021)
- District: Derbyshire Dales
- Shire county: Derbyshire
- Region: East Midlands
- Country: England
- Sovereign state: United Kingdom
- Post town: HOPE VALLEY
- Postcode district: S32
- Dialling code: 01433
- Police: Derbyshire
- Fire: Derbyshire
- Ambulance: East Midlands
- UK Parliament: Derbyshire Dales

Froggatt is a village and a civil parish on the A625 road and the River Derwent in the English county of Derbyshire. The population of the civil parish at the 2021 census was 185. It is near the village of Calver.

== Toponymy ==
The name Froggatt could take its name from several derivations, including Frog Cottage (Old English Frogga Cot), and in 1203, a document recorded the settlement here as being Froggegate.

== History ==
In the thirteenth century, the manor of Baslow was divided into two moieties, one going to the Vernons and the other to the Bassetts. Froggatt or Froggecotes, as it was at that time, was held by the Bassets. In about 1290, John Froggecotes of Froggecotes bought land and property, including a grove of trees, from Simon Bassett. This land, plus more that was purchased from time to time, remained in the family until 1752 when the senior branch of the family died out.

John Froggecotes has many living descendants from a junior branch of the family headed by Thomas Froggott of Folds Farm, Calver.

== Culture and community ==
Froggatt has a place of worship, a Wesleyan chapel and a pub, the Chequers Inn.

== Landmarks ==
The village has a quaint seventeenth-century bridge, unusual in that it has two differently shaped and sized arches. There is a gritstone escarpment called Froggatt Edge nearby.

== See also ==
- Listed buildings in Froggatt, Derbyshire
