= Samuel Ward (taster) =

Food taster to Bonnie Prince Charlie

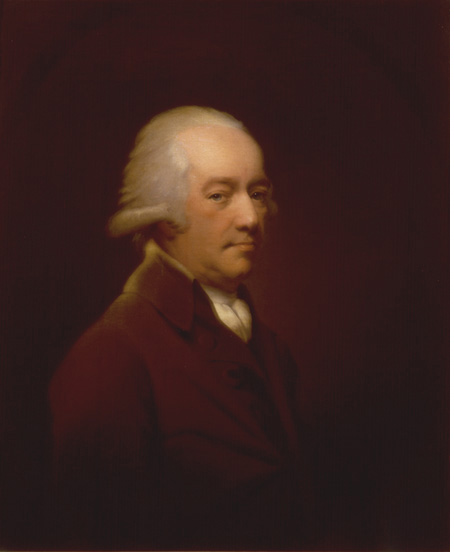
- Samuel Ward, 1781, by Joseph Wright of Derby
- Born: 1732; Derby
- Died: 1820 (aged 87–88)
- Known for: being a taster for Bonnie Prince Charlie

Samuel Ward (1732–1820) owned property in Derby and Richmond in England. As a boy he was food taster to Bonnie Prince Charlie and was rewarded with a diamond ring which is now in the collection of Derby Museum and Art Gallery along with his 1781 portrait by Joseph Wright.

== Biography ==
Ward lived in Derby. When Bonnie Prince Charlie was staying at Exeter House in Derby on 4 December 1745, his mother allowed Samuel to be the young pretender's food taster. Ward was then the son of an Alderman who was being brought up by his widowed mother. During his short stay Bonnie Prince Charlie made his decision to give up on his march on London to seize the crown of England. He gave Ward's mother a diamond ring in thanks for their service before he left. The gold ring consists of one larger diamond surrounded by ten smaller diamonds. The decision to retreat to Scotland meant that the Young Pretender would not take George II's crown and his army retreated to Scotland, where they were finally defeated in 1746 at the Battle of Culloden.

Ward went on to be a businessman in Derby and was painted by Joseph Wright of Derby around 1781. The ring remained with his descendants and the ring and the painting are now in the collection of Derby Museum and Art Gallery in England. Notes that came with the painting describe Ward as being "of Derby but later from Richmond". His wife was from Richmond and he owned property there and in Derby.

== History ==
The painting is first referred to in Joseph Wright's accounts, where he records its price as twelve guineas in 1781. The Joseph Wright painting remained in the Ward family until the death of Sarah Ward in 1947, whose gift went to Derby Art Gallery.

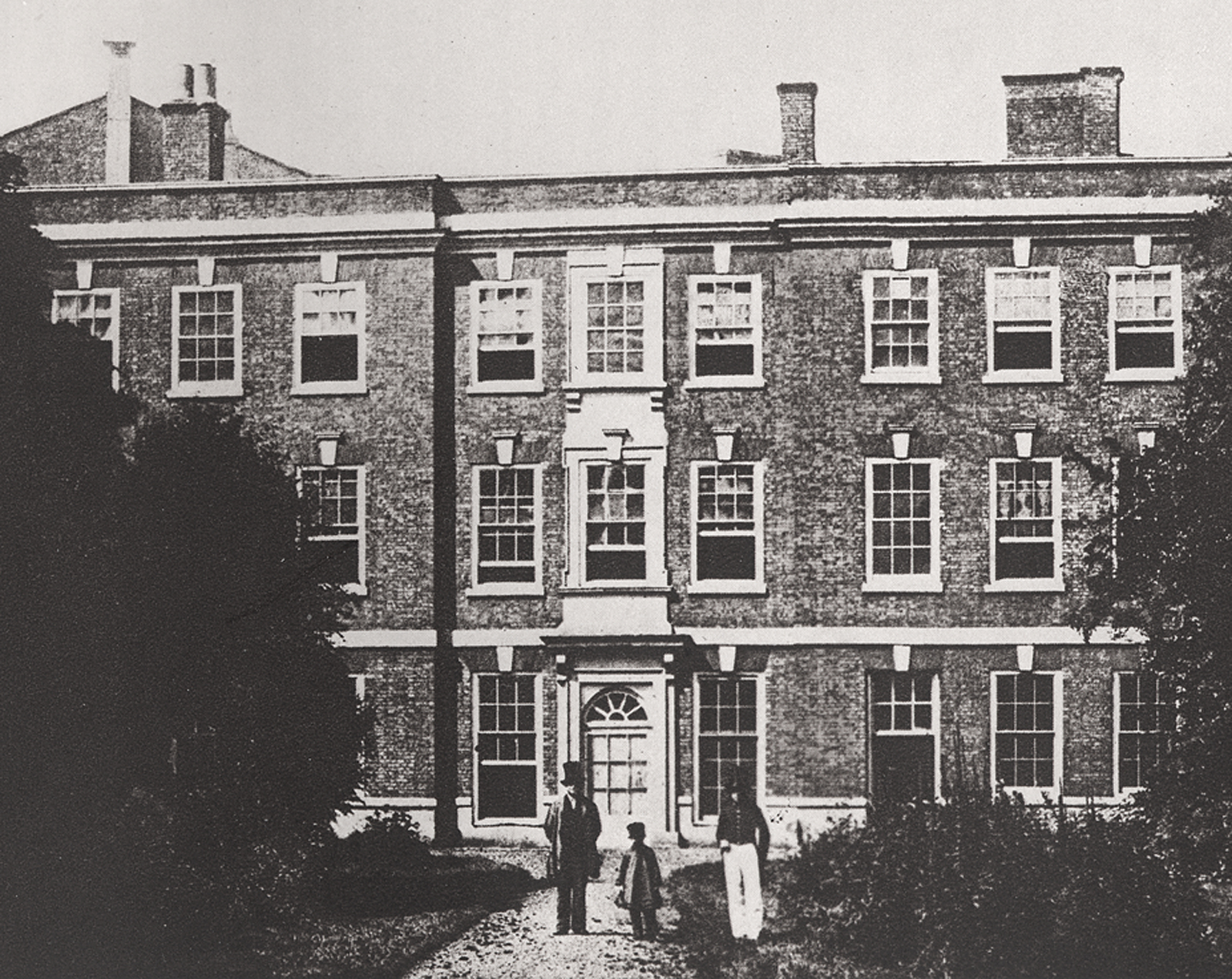
Exeter House

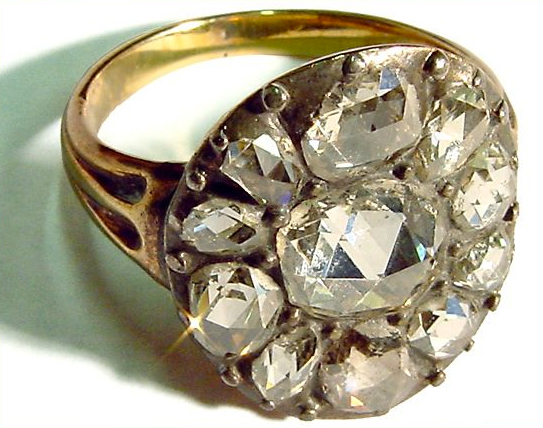
The ring given to 13-year-old Samuel
