= William Hutton (historian) =

English writer (1723–1815)

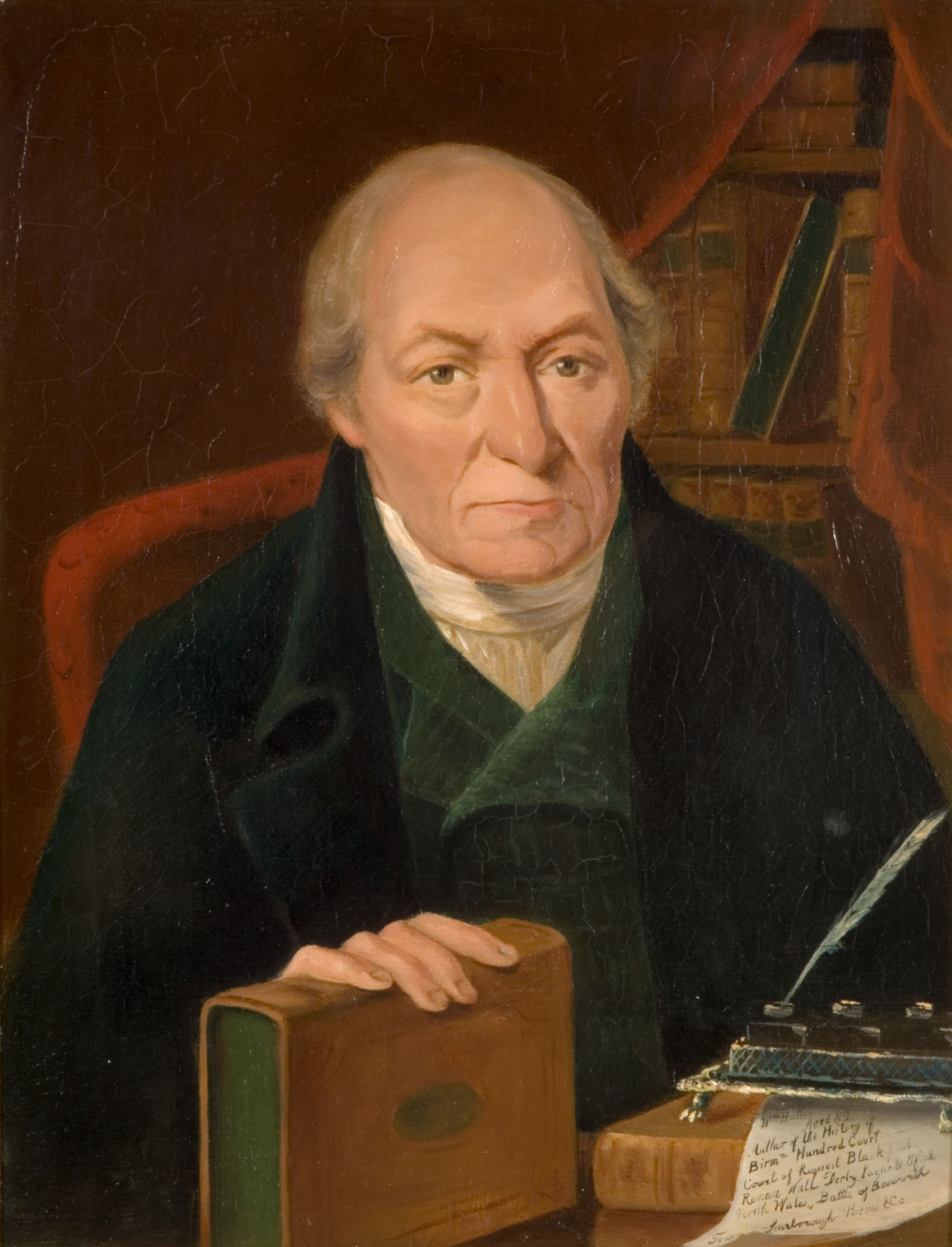
- William Hutton, about 1780
- Born: 30 September 1723; Derby, England, Great Britain
- Died: 20 September 1815 (aged 91)
- Occupations: Historian, poet
- Known for: Historian of Birmingham and Derby
- Notable work: An History of Birmingham
- Spouse: Sarah Cock (1755–?)
- Children: Catherine Hutton

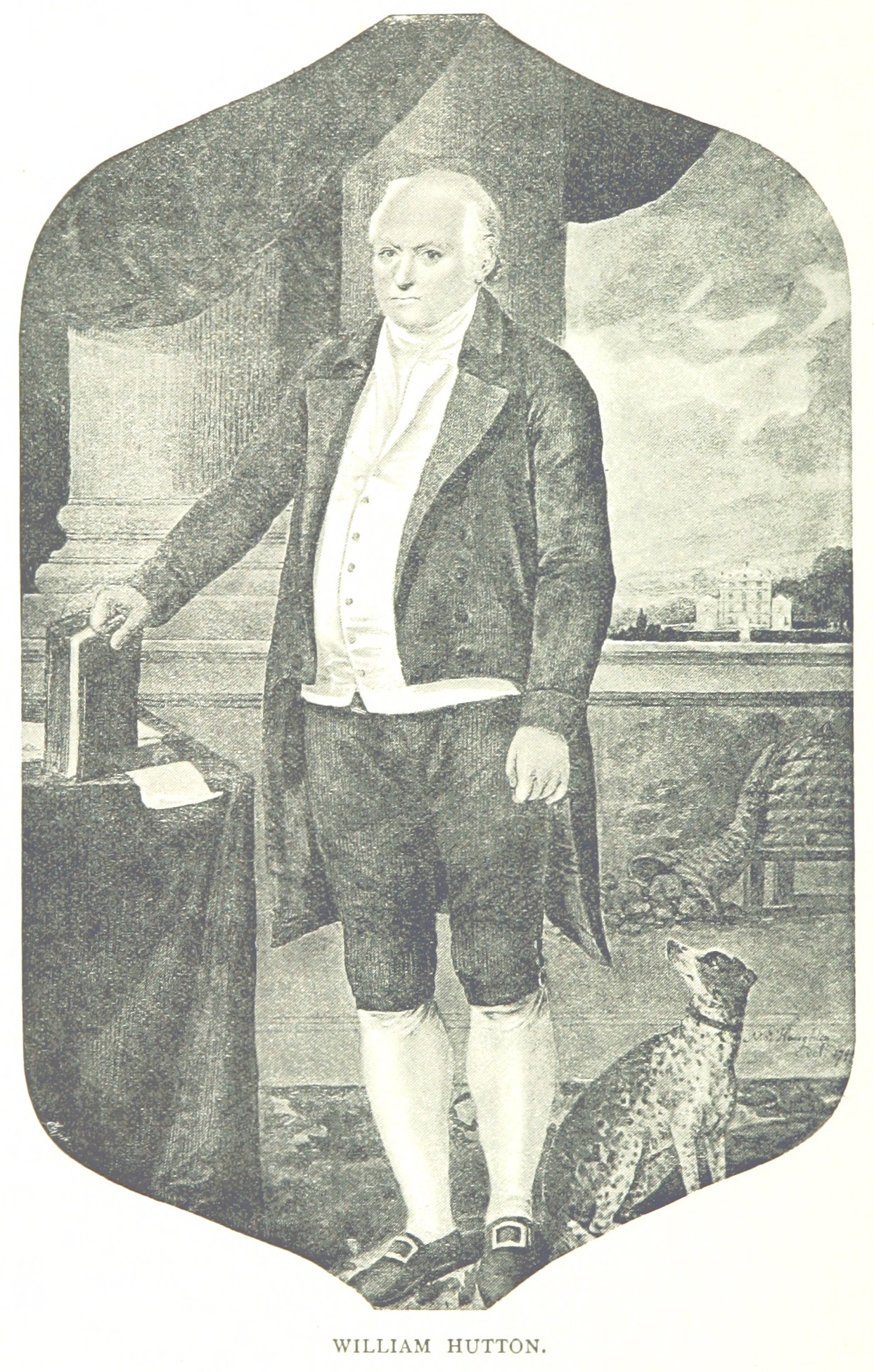
William Hutton

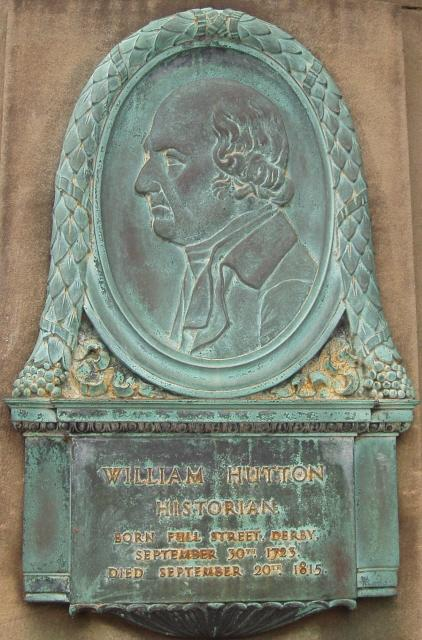
Bas relief on Derby's Exeter Bridge.

William Hutton (30 September 1723 – 20 September 1815) was an English poet and historian. Originally from Derby, he moved to Birmingham and became the first significant historian of the city, publishing his History of Birmingham in 1781.

== Biography ==
A Unitarian nonconformist born in Derby, William Hutton went to school when five years old. Aged seven years he was employed in a Derby Silk Mill on a seven-year apprenticeship. In 1737 he took a second apprenticeship as a stocking maker in Nottingham under his uncle. In 1746, after his uncle had died, he taught himself bookbinding, and three years later opened a shop in Southwell, Nottinghamshire. This was not successful and he moved to Birmingham in 1750 and opened a small bookshop.

Hutton married Sarah Cock from Aston-on-Trent in 1755 and they had three sons and a daughter, Catherine Hutton (1756–1846), who became a writer.

In 1756, Hutton opened a paper warehouse – the first in Birmingham – which became profitable. He built a country house on Bennetts Hill in Washwood Heath, and bought a house in High Street. He published his History of Birmingham in 1782 and was also elected as Fellow of the Antiquarian Society of Scotland (F. A. S. S.). He was elected overseer of the poor, and in 1787, to the Court of Requests, a small claims court for 19 years, handling over 100,000 claims.

Both Hutton's houses were destroyed in the Birmingham Riots in 1791 (the Priestley Riots) leading to his historical account in Narrative of the riots. He managed to recover £5,390 in a claim for damages against the town.

William Hutton is generally held to be the first person in modern times to walk the entire length of Hadrian's Wall, producing an account of his 1801 journey in The History of the Roman Wall. Walking 600 miles from his Birmingham home, along the wall, and back home again, he wrote in the preface, "I have given a short sketch of my approach to this famous Bulwark; have described it as it appears in the present day, and stated my return. Perhaps, I am the first man that ever traveled the whole length of this Wall, and probably the last that will ever attempt it ...".

Hutton lived chiefly on a vegetarian diet.

== Legacy ==
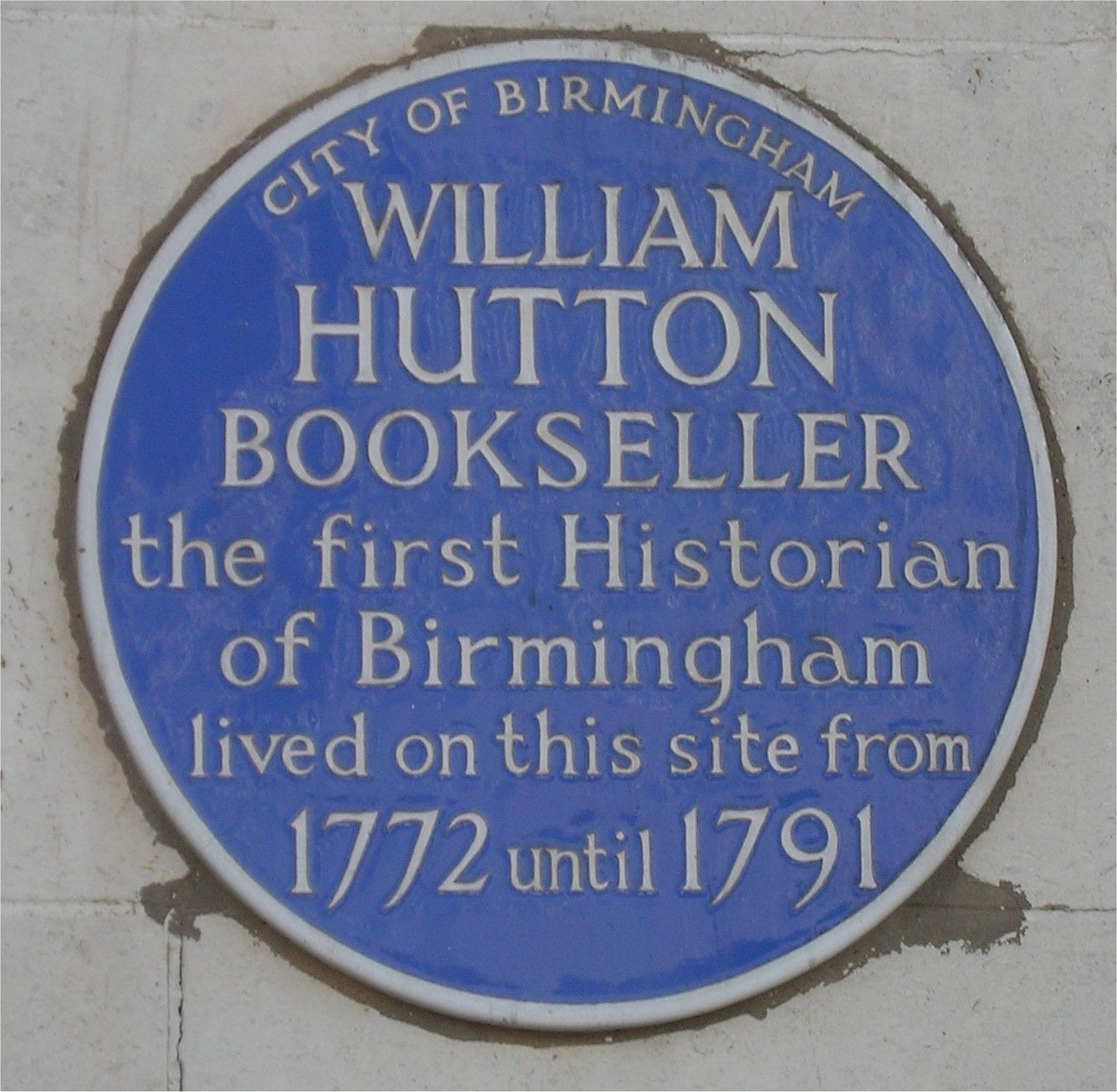
Blue plaque to William Hutton in Birmingham.

Hutton completed his autobiography The Life of William Hutton just before his death in 1815. He is commemorated by a blue plaque on Waterstone's bookshop on High Street, near the start of New Street, Birmingham and as a Bas relief on Derby's Exeter Bridge close to the Mill where he did his apprenticeship. A memorial exists in St Margaret's Church, Ward End.

The former Boots the Chemist building at 45 St Peter's Street, Derby, is a Grade II listed, Arts-and-Crafts style structure built in 1912 featuring 4 small statues in niches on its facade of Florence Nightingale, Jedediah Strutt, John Lombe, and William Hutton.

There is a portrait of William Hutton by an unknown artist in Derby Museum and Art Gallery.

== Works ==
- An History of Birmingham (1781)
- Journey to London (1784)
- Courts of requests (1787)
- Battle of Bosworth field (1788)
- History of Blackpool (1788)
- A dissertation on juries with a description of the Hundred Court (1788)
- History of the Hundred Courts (1790)
- History of Derby (1791)
- The Barbers, a poem (1793)
- Edgar and Elfrida, a poem (1793)
- The History of the Roman Wall (1802)
- Remarks upon North Wales (1803)
- Tour to Scarborough (1803)
- Poems, chiefly tales (1804)
- Trip to Coatham (1808)
- The Life of William Hutton, F.A.S.S. including a particular account of the riots of Birmingham in 1791, and the history of his family, written by himself, and published by his daughter, Catherine Hutton (1816)
- The Life of William Hutton, Stationer, of Birmingham, and the history of his family, written by himself (1841).

== Sources ==
- Literary Heritage West Midlands
- Chambers' Book of Days
- Breeze, D.J. (2006) J. Collingwood Bruce's Handbook to the Roman Wall (Newcastle)
- Jewitt, Llewellynn (1869) The Life of William Hutton, and the History of the Hutton Family
