= Hood Brook =

Coordinates: 53°20′11″N 1°39′20″W

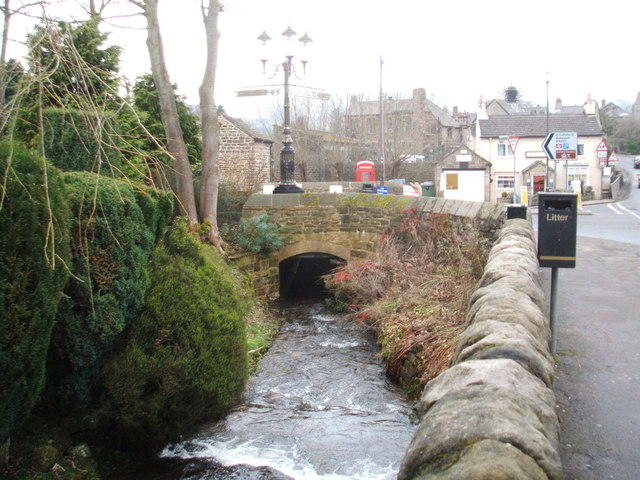
- The Hood Brook in Hathersage

Location
- Country: England

Physical characteristics
- Source
  - location: near Stanage Edge
- Mouth
  - location: River Derwent, Derbyshire

Hood Brook is a stream in the Derbyshire Peak District, originating near Stanage Edge, close to Robin Hoods Cave.

== Background ==
Hood Brook flows south through Hathersage, under the A6187 before meeting the River Derwent near Nether Hall.

During the 18th century, it was diverted and used to power local mills.

== See also ==
- List of rivers of England
