= St Mary's Church, Derby =

Coordinates: 52.9272°N 1.4790°W

St Mary's Church
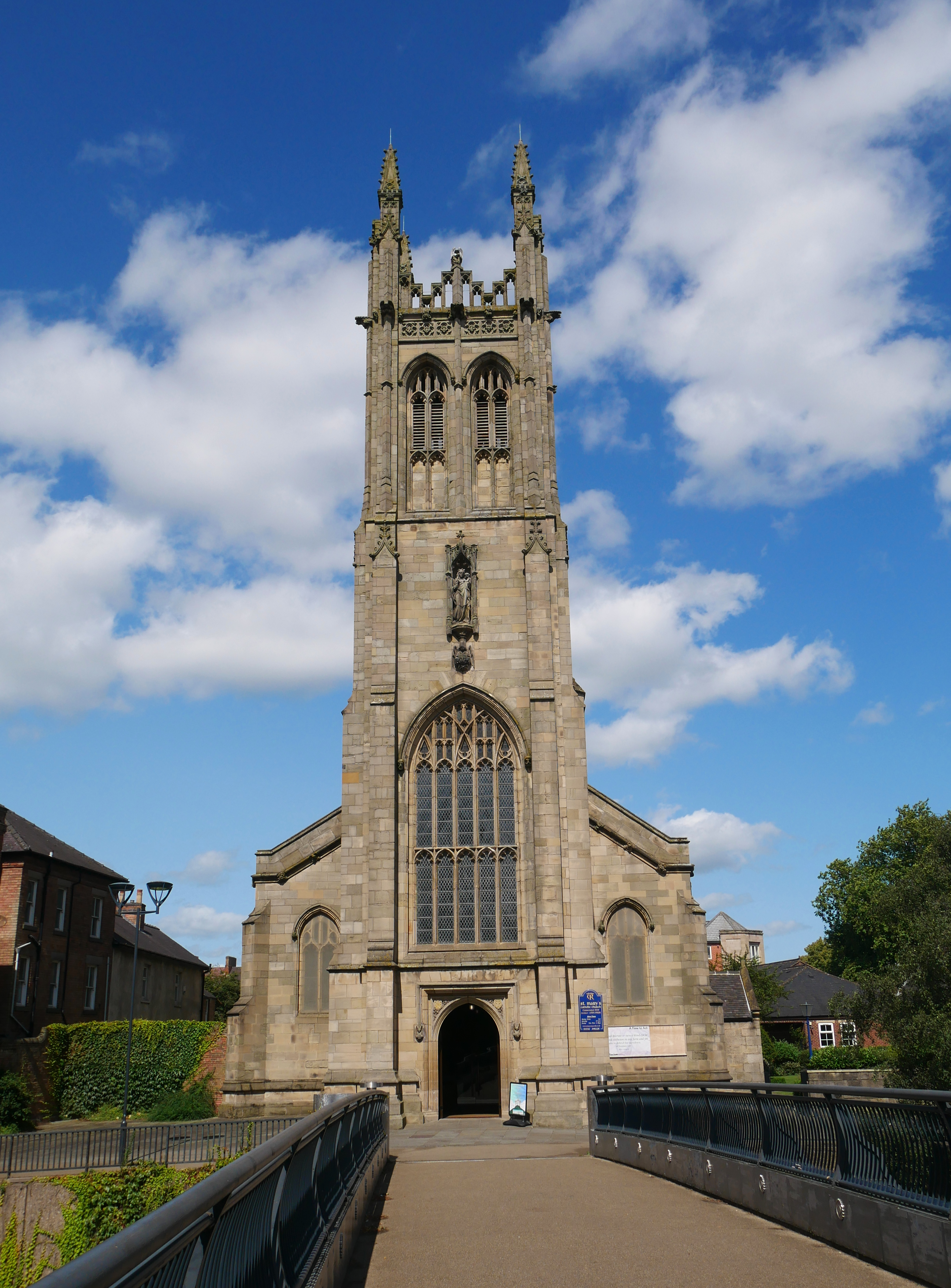
- South face of the Church

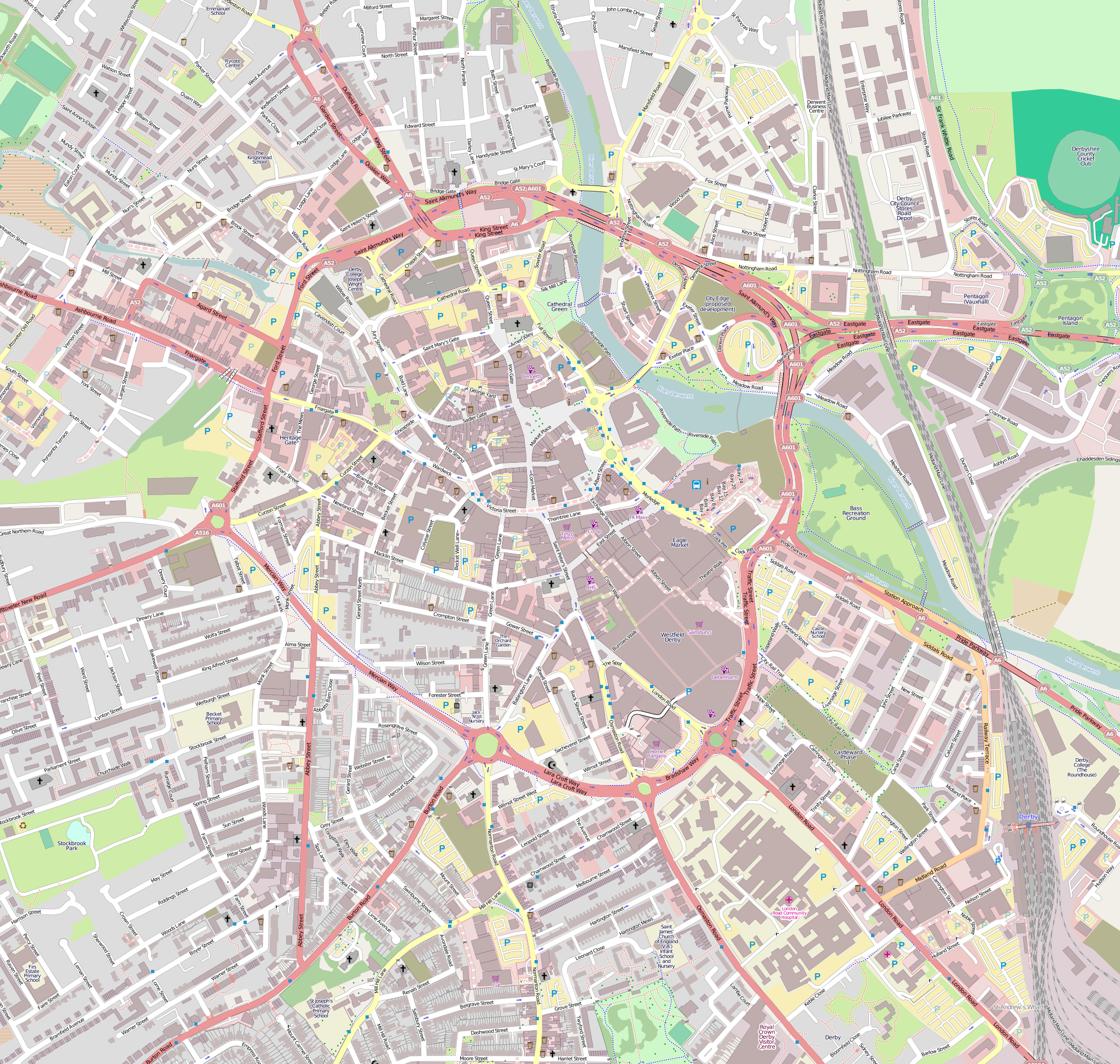
- Location within Derby Central
- Location: Derby, Derbyshire
- Country: England
- Denomination: Roman Catholic
- Website: http://www.stmarysparish.co.uk/

History
- Dedicated: 9 October 1839

Architecture
- Architect: A. W. N. Pugin
- Style: Gothic Revival
- Groundbreaking: 4 July 1838
- Completed: October 1839
- Construction cost: £1400

Administration
- Diocese: Nottingham

Clergy
- Priest(s): Parish Priest: Rev. Cannon Andrew Cole, Assistant Priests: Fr Julius Ekwogge

St Mary's Church is a Roman Catholic church in the city of Derby, England. A Grade II* listed building, it stands on Bridge Gate overlooking St Alkmund's Way. The church was designed by architect A. W. N. Pugin and according to Simon Jenkins, it is one of Pugin's "few complete works".

== History ==
The church was designed by Augustus Pugin in 1837 to replace a small Gothic building in nearby Chapel Street. It was Pugin's first expression of his Gothic Revival style. He originally planned for the tower to have a 100 feet (30 m) spire, but budget restrictions prevented this from being implemented. His final design was presented on 17 March 1838, and construction began that same year, with the foundation stone being laid in July 1838. Building was completed by 9 October 1839, when the dedication service took place with Cardinal Nicholas Wiseman preaching. The cost of construction had been £1,400. The wood sedilia in the sanctuary was donated to the church by Pugin.

Eight years later, the Anglican St Alkmund's Church was re-built on a site directly opposite St Mary's. The position of the larger St Alkmund's was such that the view of St Mary's from King Street was obscured.

In 1850, a chapel was added dedicated to Our Lady of Lourdes. Later a floodlit statue of Mary was placed on the tower, forming a landmark, although it has been removed. The church was partially restored in 1927 when it was discovered that damp had taken hold on much of the plasterwork. St Mary's was enlarged slightly in 1932 with the building of the Lady Chapel and several pieces of stonework were added to both the interior and the exterior of the building.

The late 1960s brought sweeping changes to the Derby landscape. St Alkmund's Church and its churchyard were demolished in order to make way for the inner ring road, exposing St Mary's to full view for the first time in 120 years.

A new set of bells was added during a facelift which took place between April 1988 and September 1989, during which the church was closed. A second restoration was undertaken in the late 1990s. This included re-roofing of the Lady Chapel and extensive cleaning of the interior and exterior of the church.

In 2007 the Saint Alkmund's Way Footbridge that allows pedestrians to cross the inner ring road, the A601 (St Alkmund's Way) was replaced with a wider design at a cost of £1.3m.

== Interior ==
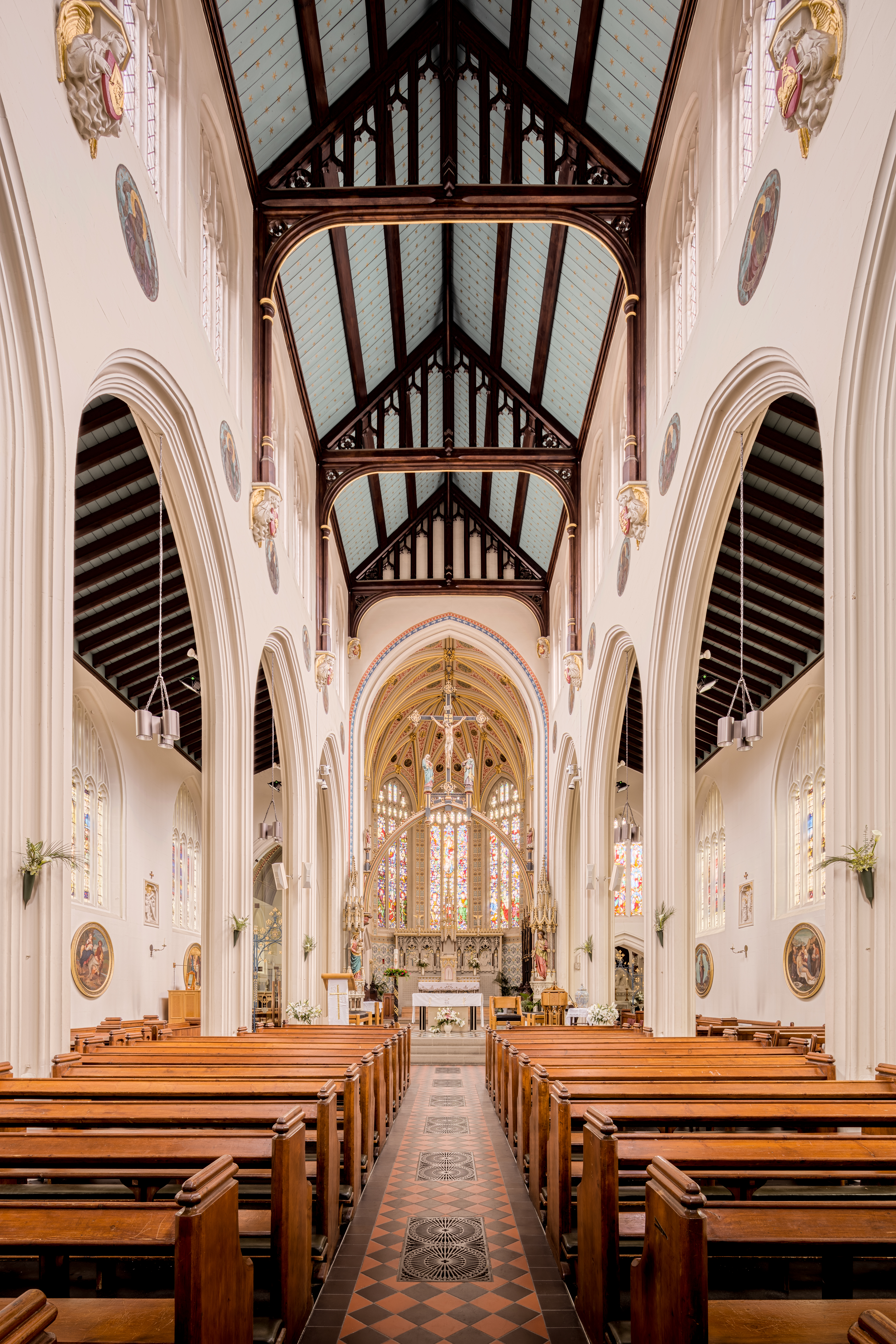
The Nave

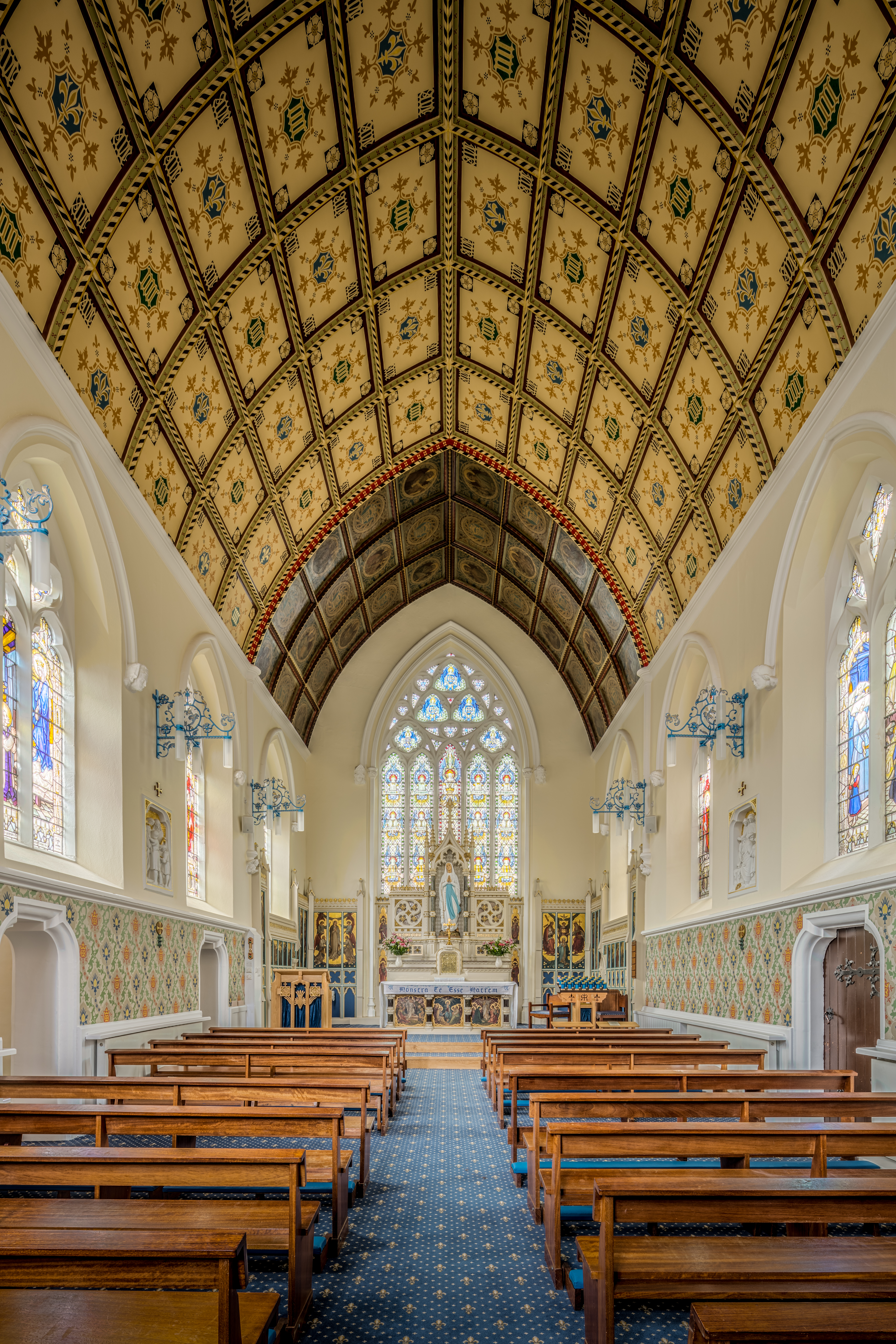
The Chapel

== See also ==
- Grade II* listed buildings in Derby
- Listed buildings in Derby (northern area)
