= Saint Alkmund's Way Footbridge =

Saint Alkmunds Way Footbridge
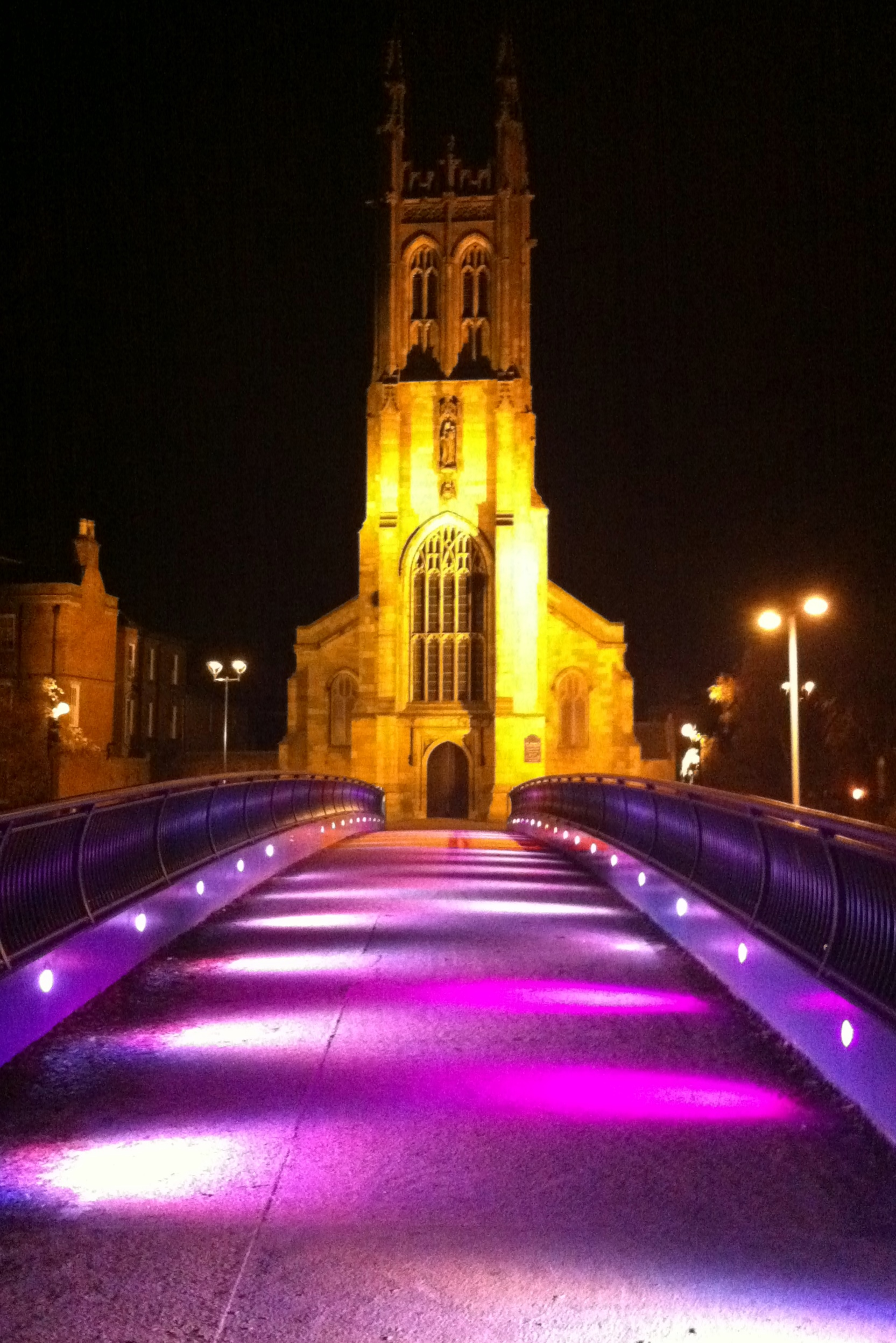
- Saint Alkmunds Way Footbridge
- Coordinates: 52.927°N 1.479°W
- Carries: Pedestrians & Cycles
- Crosses: Saint Alkmunds Way (A601)
- Locale: Derbyshire
- Maintained by: Derby City Council

Characteristics
- Total length: 45 Metres
- Width: 5 Metres
- Height: 6.2 Metres

History
- Designer: Derby City Council. Clive Russel, Mohammed Haque, Phill Massey & Peter Dobson Public Art by:Dennis O’Connor & T4
- Construction start: August 2006
- Opened: October 2007

Statistics
- Daily traffic: 1,500 (2009 estimates)
- Toll: Free

Saint Alkmund's Way Footbridge is a replacement cycle and footbridge in Derby, England over the A601 (St Alkmund's Way). The 2007 design includes sculptures of silk bobbins at its entrance and exit that are inspired by the nearby Silk Mill museum.

== Description ==
In 2007 Derby City Council demolished and rebuilt the footbridge over St Alkmund's Way to link the city centre with St Mary's Church. It is one of Derby's most-seen bridges and the council worked with Public Artist Denis O'conner and T4 sustainability to design more aesthetically pleasing solution, viewed by an estimated 1,500 pedestrian and 70,000 motorists every day. Funding came from Derby City Council, the Department for Transport and the Derby and Derbyshire Economic Partnership. The final cost was £1.3 million, and the council's contribution was part of a £2 million overspend on highways in 2007.

The bridge design was inspired by the traditional silk route through the city and has given inspiration to the Cathedral Green Footbridge, with its needle-shaped mast, as they both draw inspiration from the Silk Mill and use its heritage as inspiration. Derby Councillor Chris Wynn, cabinet member for planning and highways, said "The design with the bobbins and billowing silk idea will tie in well with the Silk Mill and I think this will be very exciting when it comes to fruition."

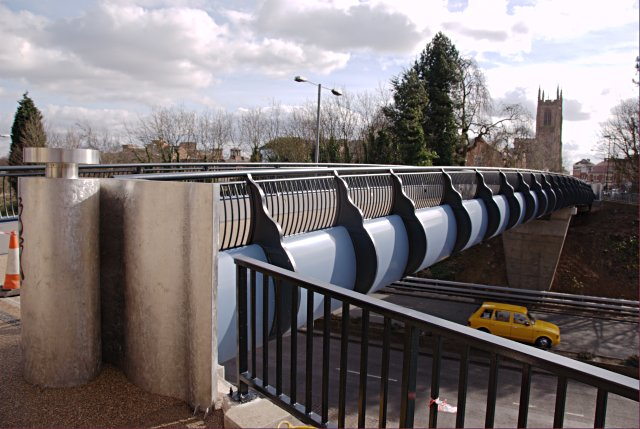
The side of the bridge showing one of the silk bobbin sculptures, which are at both ends of the bridge.

The bridge took fourteen weeks to construct, is wider than its predecessor and designed to take cycles and pedestrians. Although a shortage of steel meant that some of the design features and the lighting were not installed when it was nominally complete in October 2007.
