= Charles Herbert Aslin =

English architect

Charles Herbert Aslin CBE PPRIBA (15 December 1893 – 18 April 1959) was a British architect.

He was born in Ecclesfield, Sheffield, the son of steelworker Arthur William and Louisa Aslin and educated at Sheffield Central School and Sheffield University. During the First World War he served in the Army Pay Corps and the Oxford and Bucks Light Infantry before being made a captain in the Royal Artillery.

After the war he was admitted to the Royal Institute of British Architects (RIBA) as an associate, becoming a fellow in 1932. He took a post in the city architect's department in Sheffield, and in 1922 was appointed as borough engineer in Rotherham, where he designed the new municipal offices. After a few years as a lecturer at Sheffield University he became an associate of the Institution of Civil Engineers and was appointed deputy county architect of Hampshire.

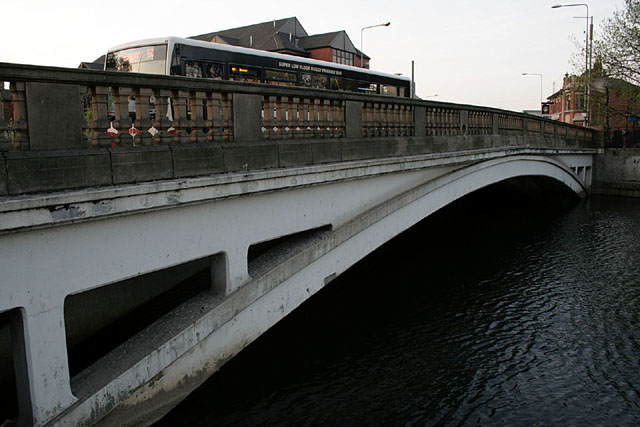
Exeter Bridge

In 1929 he became the Borough Architect for Derby responsible for the planning of major changes in the layout of the town under the title of Central Improvement Plan (CIP). In that role he is credited with the design of several major buildings both within the CIP and also elsewhere in the town, including the original 1933 Bus Station, Police Station/Magistrates' Courts, Council House, Riverside Gardens, Exeter Bridge, Exeter Place Apartments and the former Covered Market.

After the Second World War he moved to become county architect of Hertfordshire County Council, where he introduced the concept of pre-fabricated construction techniques to meet an urgent demand for new schools. Over 100 such schools were built over the next decade to his C20 pre-fabricated design.

In 1945, he was elected to the council of R.I.B.A. and elected president for 1954–56. He retired in 1958 and died in Hertford in 1959. He had married Ethel Fawcett Armitage, with whom he had one daughter.

== Works ==
- Exeter Bridge, Derby (1931)
- Derby Bus Station (1933, closed 2005, demolished 2006)
- Derby Magistrates Court and Police Station (now known as the Riverside Chambers, and used as the Local Studies Library, as well as providing office space)
- Derby Council House
- Exeter House, Derby
- Queen Street Swimming Baths, Derby

== Gallery of architectural work ==
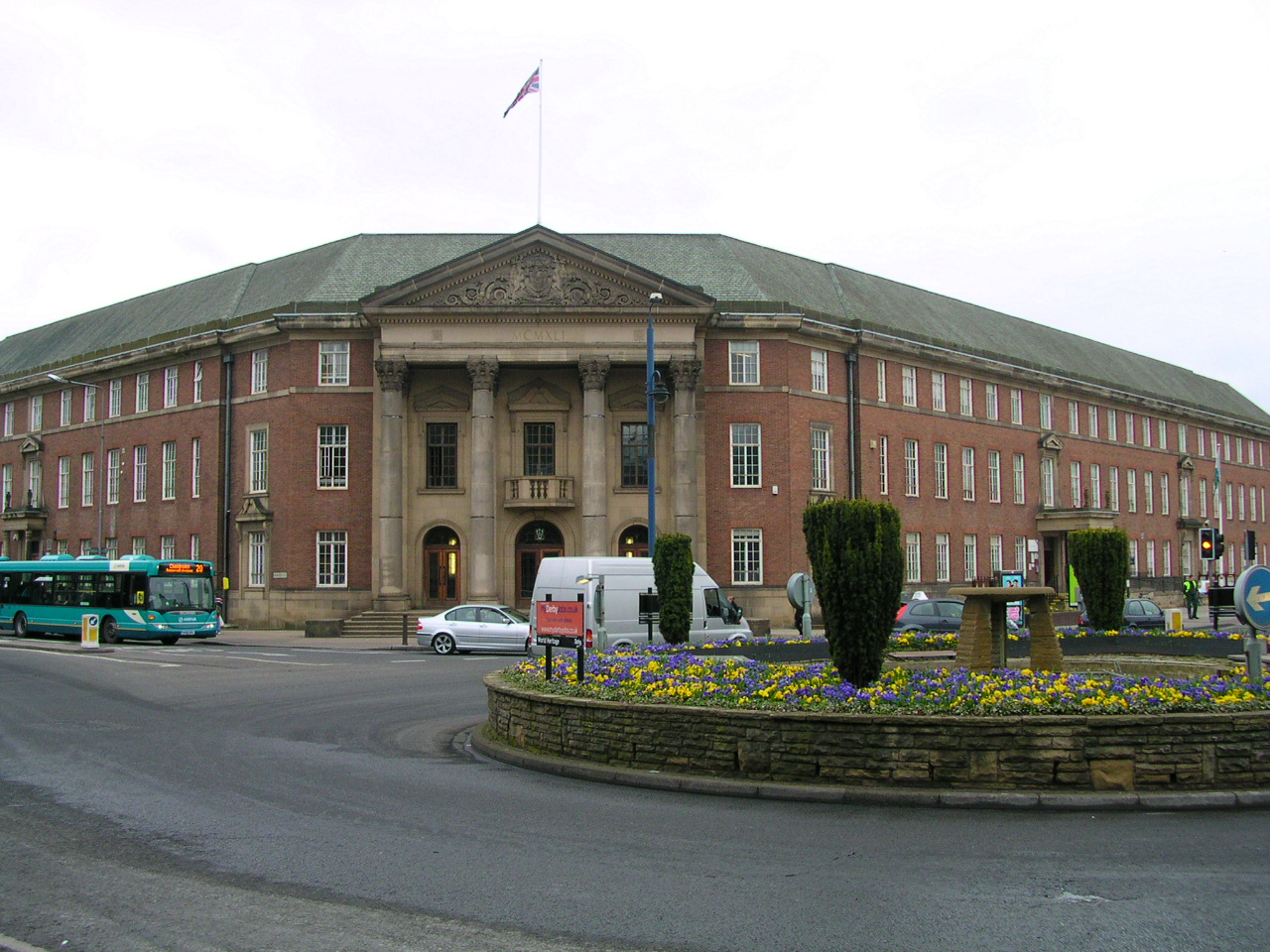
Council House, Derby

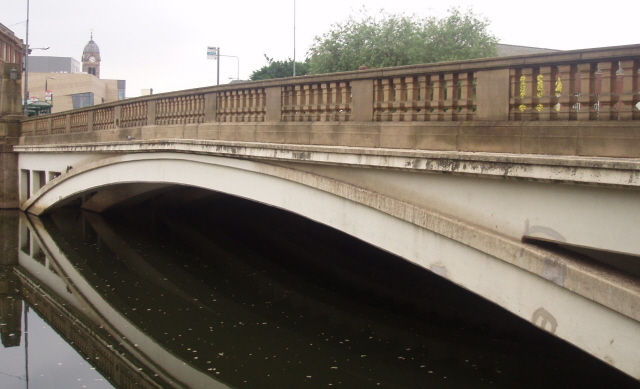
Exeter Bridge, Derby
