= Whatstandwell =

Village in Derbyshire, England

Coordinates: 53.084°N 1.502°W

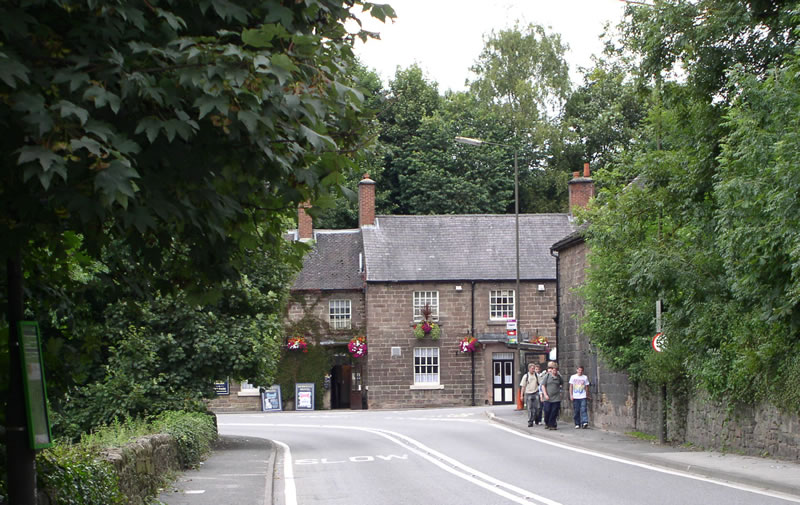
- Whatstandwell corner on the A6 road main road looking North where it turns across the Derwent bridge in an 'S' bend to left then right.

- Location within Derbyshire
- Civil parish: Crich; Alderwasley
- District: Amber Valley
- Shire county: Derbyshire
- Region: East Midlands
- Country: England
- Sovereign state: United Kingdom
- Post town: MATLOCK
- Postcode district: DE4
- Dialling code: 01773
- Police: Derbyshire
- Fire: Derbyshire
- Ambulance: East Midlands
- UK Parliament: Derbyshire Dales

Whatstandwell (/ˈwɒtstændwɛl/) is a village on the River Derwent in the Amber Valley district of Derbyshire, England. It is about five miles south of Matlock and about four miles north of Belper. Whatstandwell railway station is on the Derby–Matlock Derwent Valley line, and the A6 trunk road crosses the River Derwent in the village. Most of the population is included in the civil parish of Crich, and indeed the area to the north of the B5035 has been known as Crich Carr. That name has largely fallen into disuse, with the village of Whatstandwell generally thought to include this area and the area across the Derwent on the road towards Wirksworth and into the parish of Alderwasley.

== History ==
On Peter Perez Burdett's map of 1791, it is shown as 'Hottstandell Bridge', probably a literal spelling of the local dialect. A mid-19th-century Ordnance Survey map shows it as 'Whatstandwell Bridge' which was the name given to the railway station. The name derives from Walter Stonewell, who "held of the convent" the house next to the bridge which John de Strepul built at his own expense, in 1393.

== Geography ==
The Cromford Canal passes through the village, which was an important transport route to and from Arkwright's Cromford Mill in the 19th century. The Friends Of Cromford Canal are currently seeking to reopen this navigation in full from Cromford to its junction with the Erewash Canal at Langley Mill. This area is part of the Derwent Valley Mills Heritage Site.

To the east of the village is the steep climb to Crich and the National Tramway Museum, while a short distance to the north is the former rope-worked incline of the Cromford and High Peak Railway. To the south, on the west bank of the Derwent, lies Shining Cliff Woods, owned and managed by the Grith Pioneers.

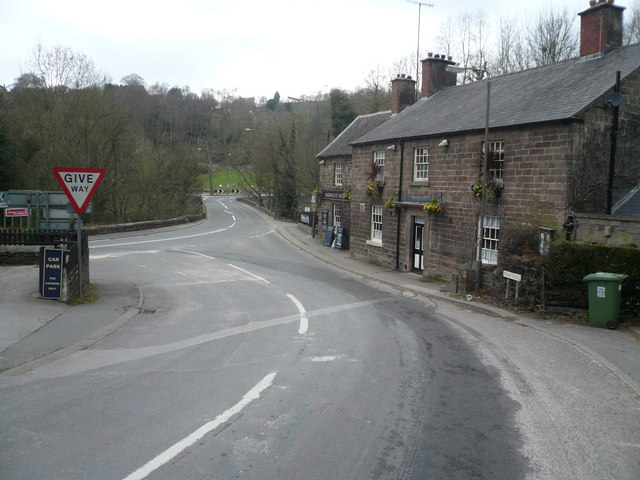
The A6 road from the Derby direction at the left behind the road-sign, with first half of the 'S' bend, the bridge over the River Derwent, and the right-turn in the distance where the road proceeds towards Matlock

== Culture and community ==
The village has an active social group that holds several village events each year. The flagship of these is the Whatstandwell Festival held across the valley at Hankin Farm in the middle of June. This features locally brewed real ale, local bands, games and a BBQ. The social group also organises a horticultural show, bonfire night, and a carol concert. The once-annual raft race was abandoned because of a lack of support and access issues.

There were two pubs at the turn of the century, but the Wheatsheaf is now a private residence, and the Derwent Hotel is a cafe/restaurant called the Family Tree.

Whatstandwell is mentioned in the D. H. Lawrence novel Sons and Lovers, published in 1913, in a scene in which Paul Morel and Miriam go on a day's outing: "They went on, miles and miles, to Whatstandwell. All the food was eaten, everybody was hungry, and there was very little money to get home with. But they managed to procure a loaf and a currant-loaf, which they hacked to pieces with shut knives, and ate sitting on the wall near the bridge, watching the bright Derwent rushing by, and the brakes from Matlock pulling up at the inn."

Ellen MacArthur, the round-the-world sailor, grew up in Whatstandwell.

Ken Smith, the subject of the Scottish BAFTA-winning film The Hermit of Treig, was born in the village. His book The Way of the Hermit, published by Pan McMillan ISBN 9781035009817 describes his childhood in the village.
