= Council House, Derby =

Municipal building in Derby, Derbyshire, England

The Council House, Derby
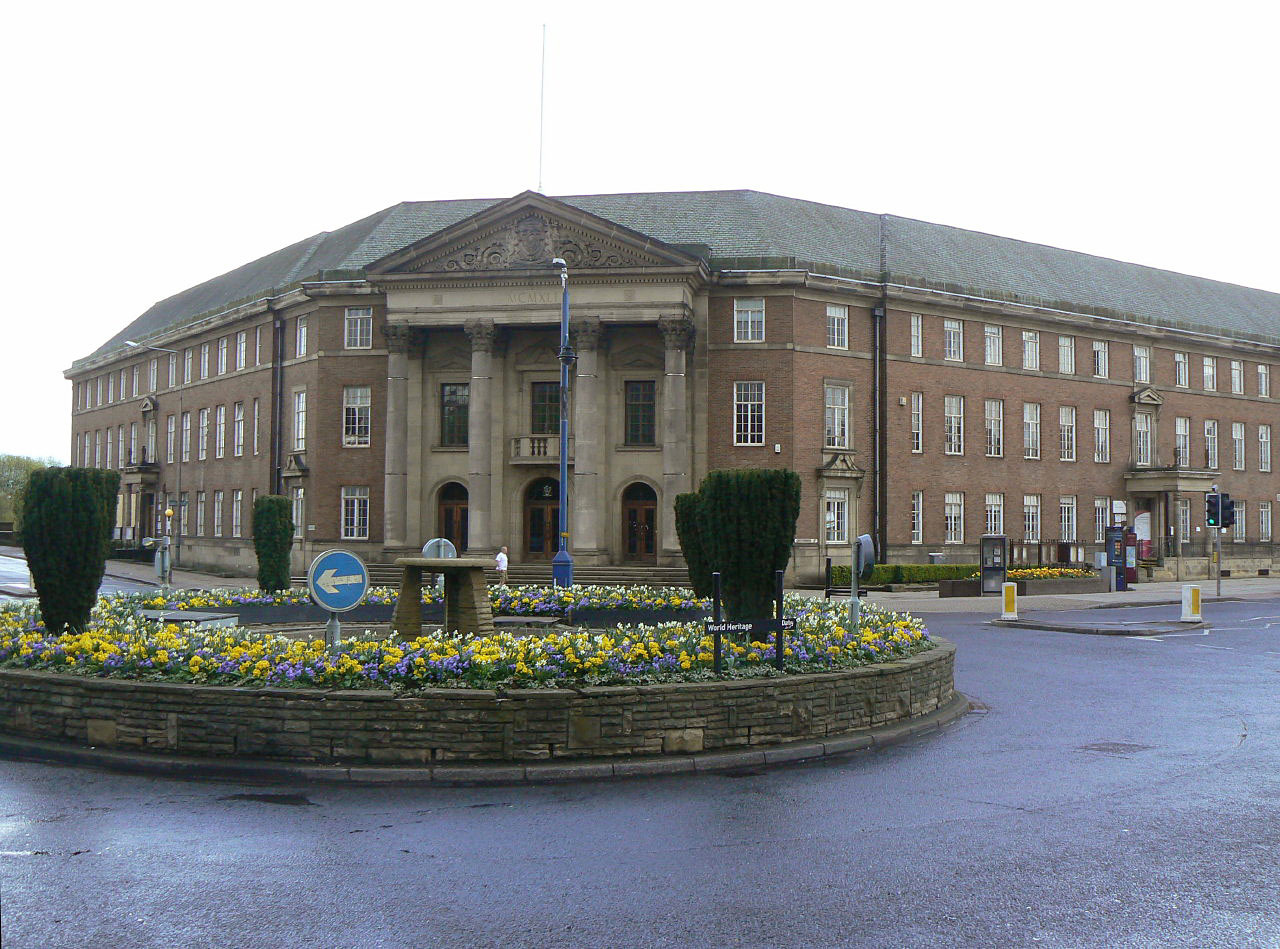
- The Council House, Derby

- Shown in Derbyshire
- 52.9233°N 1.4741°W
- Location: Derby

History
- Built: 1949

Site notes
- Architect: Charles Aslin
- Architectural style: Neo-Georgian style

The Council House is a municipal building in Corporation Street, Derby, England. It is the headquarters of Derby City Council and it is a locally listed building.

== History ==
The facility was commissioned to replace the Guildhall in the Market Place. The site chosen for the new building was previously occupied by riverside wharves and industrial premises. Work started on the new building, designed by Charles Aslin in the Neo-Georgian style, in 1938 and the part-built facility was then requisitioned by the Air Ministry during the Second World War. The original plan had involved an oval council chamber to the south of the main building as well as a clock tower but both these proposed aspects were abandoned. Conversely proposals for a large portico incorporating four Palmyrene columns and a pediment above were retained. The design of the Mayor's Chamber incorporated oak panelling recovered from Derwent Hall before it was demolished to make way for the Ladybower Reservoir in 1942. The construction work was completed after the war and the building was officially opened by Princess Elizabeth and Prince Philip in 1949.

Following a fire in the old Assembly Rooms in 1963, while the façade of the gutted building was dismantled and installed at the National Tramway Museum at Crich, the chandeliers were recovered and installed in the mayor's reception suite at the Council House. After Derby was awarded city status on 7 June 1977, the Queen presented a "charter scroll" or "letters patent" to the mayor on the steps of the Council House on 28 July 1977.

An extensive refurbishment of the building, to a design by Corstorphine & Wright, and undertaken by Royal BAM Group at a cost of £34 million, was completed in 2015. The refurbishment involved changing the building to an open plan layout so that 2,000 employees could be accommodated rather than 500 employees as previously. The scheme also involved moving the council chamber to the centre of the building with a new café and other public space forming an arc around the council chamber, and introduced energy efficiency measures such as a hydroelectric power plant and photo-voltaic panels. A room in the refurbished civic suite was designated the Jacob Rivers VC Room in memory of Private Jacob Rivers who was born at Bridgegate in Derby and was awarded the Victoria Cross in the First World War.
