= Derwent Mouth =

Location on the River Trent, England

Coordinates: 52.8725°N 1.3193°W

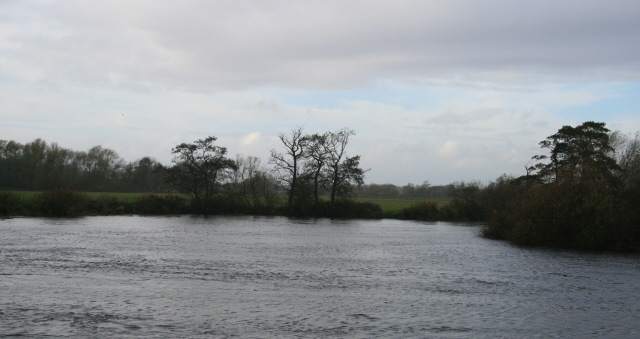
Derwent Mouth viewed from the Leicestershire bank of the River Trent

Derwent Mouth is a location on the River Trent, which at that point forms the border between the English counties of Derbyshire and Leicestershire. It is both the confluence of the River Derwent with the River Trent, and the point at which the Trent and Mersey Canal joins the natural River Trent.

Derwent Mouth is situated closest to Sawley, Derbyshire and is 1 mile (1.6 km) to the east of Shardlow, 2 miles (3.2 km) west of Trent Lock, where the navigable River Soar and Erewash Canal join the River Trent. It is about 9 miles (14 km) south-west of the centre of the city of Nottingham, and 7 miles (11 km) south-east of central Derby.

The River Trent is navigable, with the aid of locks, downstream of Derwent Mouth as far as the Humber Estuary. The Trent itself is also navigable for a short distance upstream, but most river traffic enters the parallel Trent and Mersey Canal, which provides connections to the River Mersey and the canal networks of the West Midlands region. The River Derwent is not navigable.

== Long Horse Bridge ==
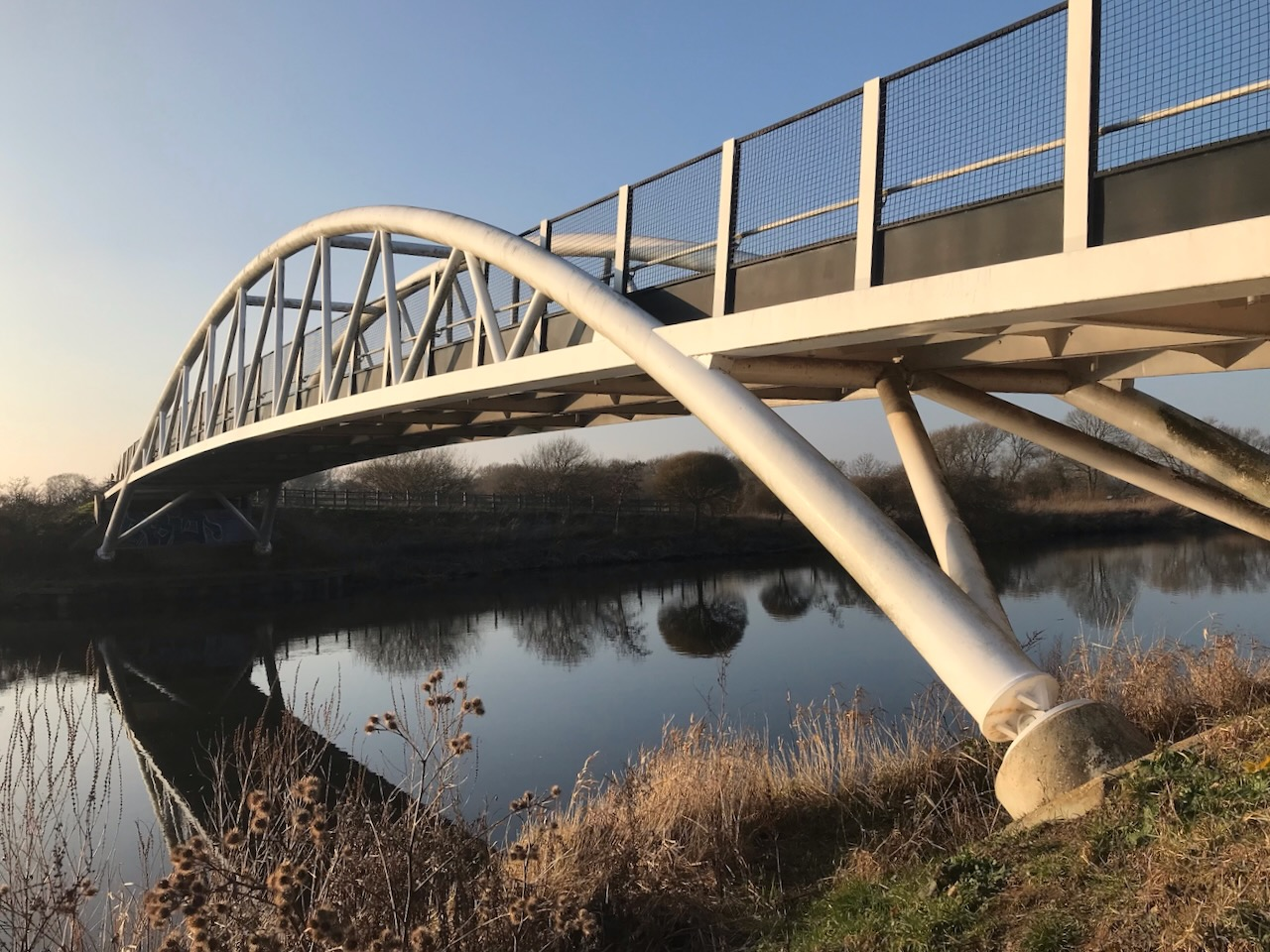
The new Long Horse Bridge in 2023

Long Horse Bridge was originally a wooden bridge that crossed the Trent at Derwent mouth to take the tow path across the river so that horses hauling the barges down the Trent & Mersey could continue along the southern bank of the Trent navigation and vice versa for boats travelling up the river.

Following a thaw in 1893, the bridge collapsed when blocks of ice carried down by the river shattered the supporting legs. Bargees who had been ensnared by the frozen conditions attempted to protect the bridge by adding heavy loads, and by fending off the ice floes. When the bridge finally gave way, James Thompson ended up afloat on the ice, and was washed downstream, but he later reached the riverbank unharmed. The wooden bridge was reconstructed after this incident.

In 1932 the Trent Navigation company rebuilt the wooden crossing at the same location using reinforced concrete. After 70 years the bridge was suffering from severe concrete degradation, and was subsequently closed in 2002 due to safety issues, and demolished a year later.

Rather than reinstate a similar bridge, it was decided to construct a wider multi-user crossing at a location some 140m upstream from Derwent Mouth. The main section of the new bridge was hoisted into position in September 2011 using large cranes, with the bridge opening in November the same year. The project to build the 60 tonne bridge which has a span of 52 m (170 ft), cost £1.4 million.

The crossing resolved a number of problems for walkers, cyclists and horse riders in that it allows the Midshires bridleway to cross the Trent and also restores the tow-path link between Shardlow and Sawley a route that previously required a detour via Cavendish Bridge. The diversion and loss of the bridge being one of the access issues identified as part of the study into the viability of the western extension of the Trent Valley Way, which begins nearby at Trent Lock. The bridge also provides a connection between the Trent Valley footpath and the Derwent Valley Heritage Way, which ends at Derwent Mouth.
