= River Derwent, Derbyshire =

River in Derbyshire, England

River Derwent
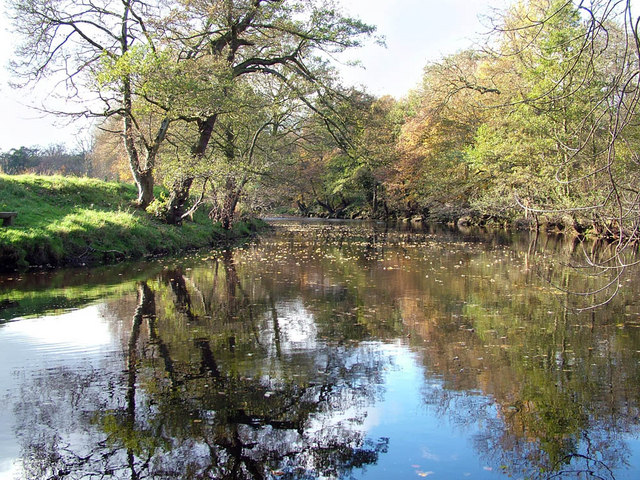
- The River Derwent, near Hathersage

Location
- Country: England
- Counties: Derbyshire

Physical characteristics
- Source
  - location: Bleaklow, east of Glossop
  - coordinates: 53.466894°N 1.813175°W
- Mouth
  - location: Derwent Mouth, River Trent
  - coordinates: 52.8738°N 1.3203°W
- Length: 80 km (50 mi)

Basin features
- Tributaries
  - left: Bentley Brook, River Amber
  - right: River Westend, River Ashop, River Noe, River Wye, River Ecclesbourne

Map showing the location of Source (Bleaklow) and Derwent Mouth within Derbyshire

The Derwent is a river in Derbyshire, England. It is 50 miles (80 km) long and is a tributary of the River Trent, which it joins south of Derby. The river's course is largely in the Peak District and its foothills.

Much of the river's route, with the exception of the city of Derby, is rural. However, the river has also seen many human uses, and between Matlock and Derby was one of the cradles of the Industrial Revolution. It is the site of the Derwent Valley Mills, the first industrial-scale cotton mills. Today it provides a water supply to several surrounding cities, and its steep-sided valley is an important communications corridor through the uplands of the Peak District.

The scenery of the Derwent valley attracts many tourists. The upper reaches pass through the Peak District National Park, whilst the middle reaches around the old spa town of Matlock Bath offer souvenir shops and amusement arcades, together with attractions such as the Heights of Abraham and its cable car.

== Etymology ==
Derwent is derived from Brittonic river name *Deruentiū, Latinised as Deruentiō, meaning "(belonging/pertaining to the) forest of oak trees"; the old river name survived in medieval Welsh poetry, such as Peis Dinogat ("Dinogad's Smock") attached to the larger poem Y Gododdin, as Derwennydd.

== Course ==
The River Derwent rises at Swains Greave (590 metres (1,940 ft) above sea level) on the eastern flank of Bleaklow, opposite Howden Moors, and some 6 miles (9.7 km) east of Glossop. It flows through the Upper Derwent Valley, and for most of its first 6 miles (9.7 km) forms the county boundary between Derbyshire, on its west bank, and South Yorkshire, on the east bank. Some 4 miles (6.4 km) into its journey it passes through three consecutive reservoirs: Howden, the highest, Derwent and Ladybower Reservoir. Derwent Reservoir is named after the now-submerged village of Derwent, which was named after the river. Once past Howden Reservoir, both banks of the river are in Derbyshire, and the river remains in the county to its mouth. Howden Reservoir is also fed by the River Westend, whilst Ladybower Reservoir is also fed by the River Ashop. The former confluences of the two tributaries with the Derwent are now submerged below the respective reservoirs.

Further south, the Derwent passes the village of Bamford, where it is joined by the River Noe. Below this confluence, it flows through Hathersage, Grindleford, Calver and Baslow, and through the estate of Chatsworth House, before it is joined by the River Wye at Rowsley. After passing through Darley Dale, the Derwent reaches Matlock, where, at an oxbow, it collects the Bentley Brook. It then flows past the villages of Matlock Bath, Cromford, Whatstandwell, and Ambergate, where it is joined by the River Amber.

Below Ambergate, the river flows through the town of Belper and the villages of Milford and Duffield, where it is joined by the River Ecclesbourne. It then enters the city of Derby near Darley Abbey and flows through the centre of the city. The river ends at Derwent Mouth, between Shardlow and Sawley, where it joins the River Trent at a height of 30 metres (98 ft) above sea level; a total drop of 560 metres (1,840 ft). Its course meanders somewhat, especially in its lower reaches, adding 16 miles (26 km) to its apparent length of 50 miles (80 km). Its waters ultimately reach the North Sea via the Humber Estuary.

== Natural history ==
The River Derwent is the habitat for many different animals such as otters, birds, insects, fish and crayfish. It is also a habitat for many wild flowers, as exemplified by the Lower Derwent Trail.

== River uses ==
Derwent Navigation Act 1719
- Act of Parliament
- Parliament of Great Britain
- Long title: An Act for making the River Darwent, in the County of Derby, navigable.
- Citation: 6 Geo. 1. c. 27
- Territorial extent: Great Britain

Dates
- Royal assent: 7 April 1720
- Commencement: 23 November 1719 (Note: Start of Session.)

Status: Current legislation

Text of statute as originally enacted

The lower river from Derwent Mouth upstream as far as Derby was made navigable under an act of Parliament of 1720, the Derwent Navigation Act 1719 (6 Geo. 1. c. 27), and this stretch opened to navigation in 1721. Traffic ceased about 1795 and the navigation was acquired by the owners of the competing Derby Canal. The river is no longer considered navigable, although the upper river is widely used by kayakers and canoeists who enjoy the fast-flowing water and the slalom course at Matlock Bath.

The river was also used to power the many textile mills that were built along the Derwent between Matlock Bath and Derby. Initially, the need for water power was quite modest, for example Lombe's Silk Mill in Derby, which is considered to be the forerunner of the later cotton mills, only needed to use the power provided by a small mill stream, and Richard Arkwright's Cromford Mill, the world's first water-powered cotton spinning mill, only used a small tributary of the Derwent in conjunction with a lead mine sough. The later mills at Belper, Darley Abbey and Masson Mill were much larger and needed to harness the full power of the river to drive their complex machinery. This required the construction of large weirs across the Derwent that still remain as significant features in the riverscape.

These sites were all important in the development of the Industrial Revolution, and Arkwright's innovation, along with several local competitors, is recognised today by the designation of the area as the Derwent Valley Mills World Heritage Site.

The power of the Derwent is still harnessed at a number of these historic mill sites, producing hydro-electricity from turbines instead of driving mill wheels, with a recent development being the construction of a hydro-electric station at Longbridge weir, adjacent to the Riverside Gardens in Derby.

Howden and Derwent Reservoirs in the upper valley were both completed in 1916 to supply the cities of Sheffield, Nottingham, Derby, and Leicester. The adjacent Ladybower Reservoir was completed in 1945 to cover increasing demand. Treated water from these reservoirs flows down the 28-mile (45 km) Derwent Valley Aqueduct parallel to the river. The river also indirectly supplies Carsington Reservoir, with the water taken from the river by a pumping station at Ambergate in times of high flow. When flows are low, water is released back into the river via the same 6.5-mile (10.5 km) route of tunnels and aqueducts, thus allowing greater abstraction rates downstream at Little Eaton in the drier summer months. Today all these reservoirs are managed by Severn Trent Water.

The valley of the Derwent provides an important communications route. Between Derby and Rowsley the valley is followed by the A6 road, which was the main road from London to Manchester until the creation of the motorway network, and is still a busy single-carriageway road. The former Midland Railway's lines from Derby to Sheffield and Manchester also followed the Derwent, the former as far as Ambergate and the latter as far as Rowsley. The Sheffield line still operates as part of the Midland Main Line, but the Manchester line was severed north of Matlock in 1968, and the section from Ambergate to Matlock now forms the Derwent Valley Line, a single-track branch line. Between Ambergate and Cromford, the river, road and railway are also paralleled by the Cromford Canal. The terminus was once connected to Manchester across the High Peak by the early Cromford and High Peak Railway.

== Tributaries ==
Alphabetical listing of tributaries, extracted from the Water Framework Directive list of water bodies for the Derbyshire Derwent:

- River Amber
- River Ashop
- Bar Brook, which joins the Derwent near Baslow
- Black Brook, near Belper
- Bottle Brook, at Little Eaton
- Bentley Brook
- Chaddesden Brook, in Derby
- River Ecclesbourne
- Highlow Brook, near Hathersage
- Hood Brook, also near Hathersage
- Lea Brook, near High Peak Junction
- Ladybower Brook (Highshore Clough Catchment), flows into Ladybower Reservoir
- Markeaton Brook, joins the Derwent in Derby
- River Noe
- River Westend
- River Wye

== Naming ==
The River Derwent provides the name for the oldest hockey club in Derbyshire. Derwent Hockey Club was established in 1897 and played its matches on the banks of the Derwent in Darley Dale, before relocating to Wirksworth. It also gives its name to Derwent Rowing Club in Derby, founded in 1857.

== Curiosities ==
The pureness of the river has also been commented on by Charles Cotton – "Piscator" in Izaac Walton's Compleat Angler.

== Gallery ==
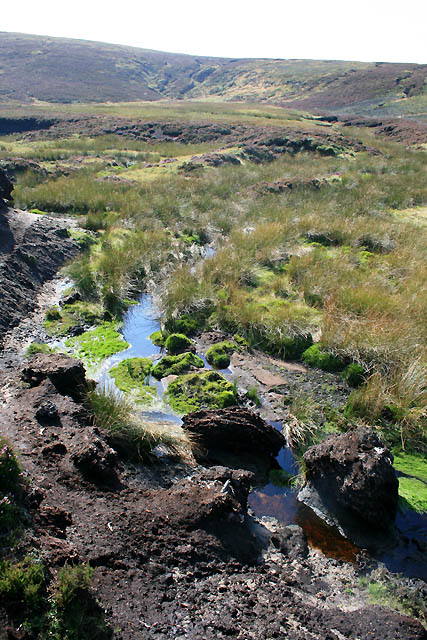
Boggy ground in Swains Greave, on Bleaklow

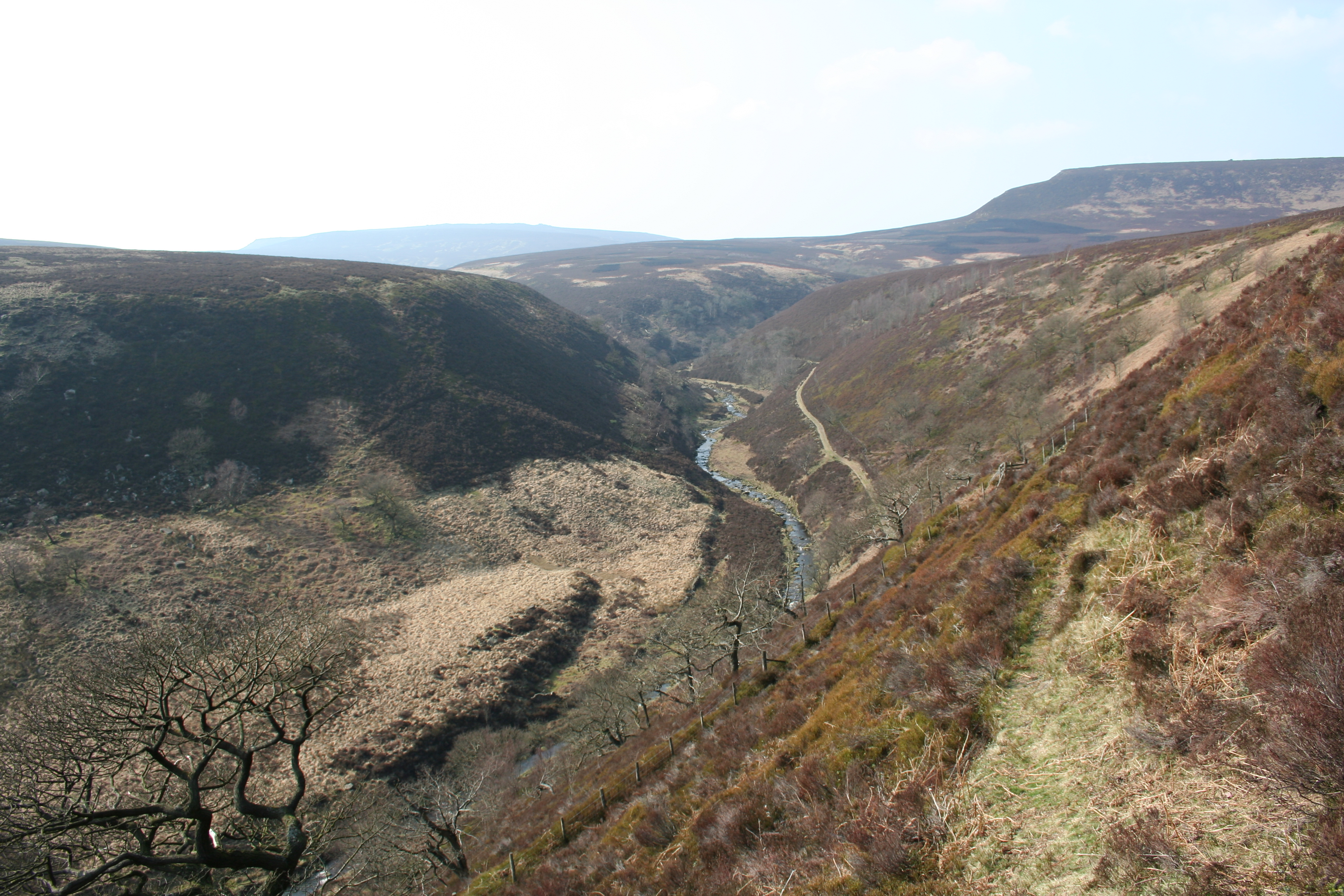
The river in its highest stretch, on Howden Moor close to the source

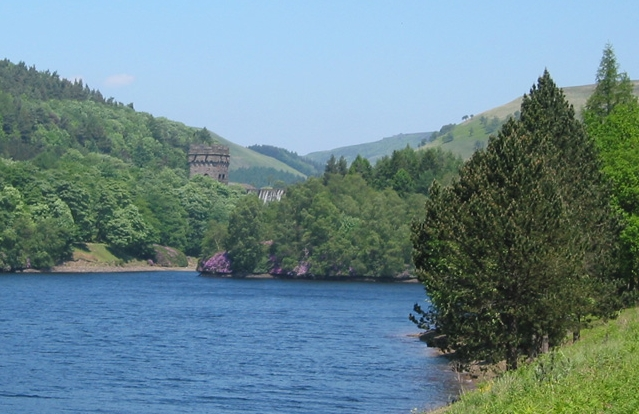
Derwent Reservoir, with river water cascading over Howden Dam, and Howden Moor in the background

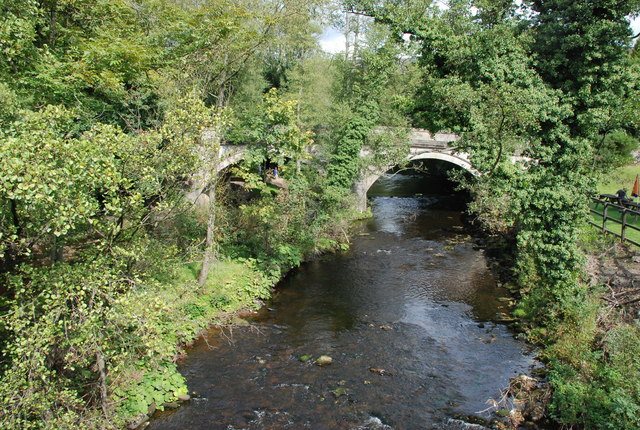
The river at Calver

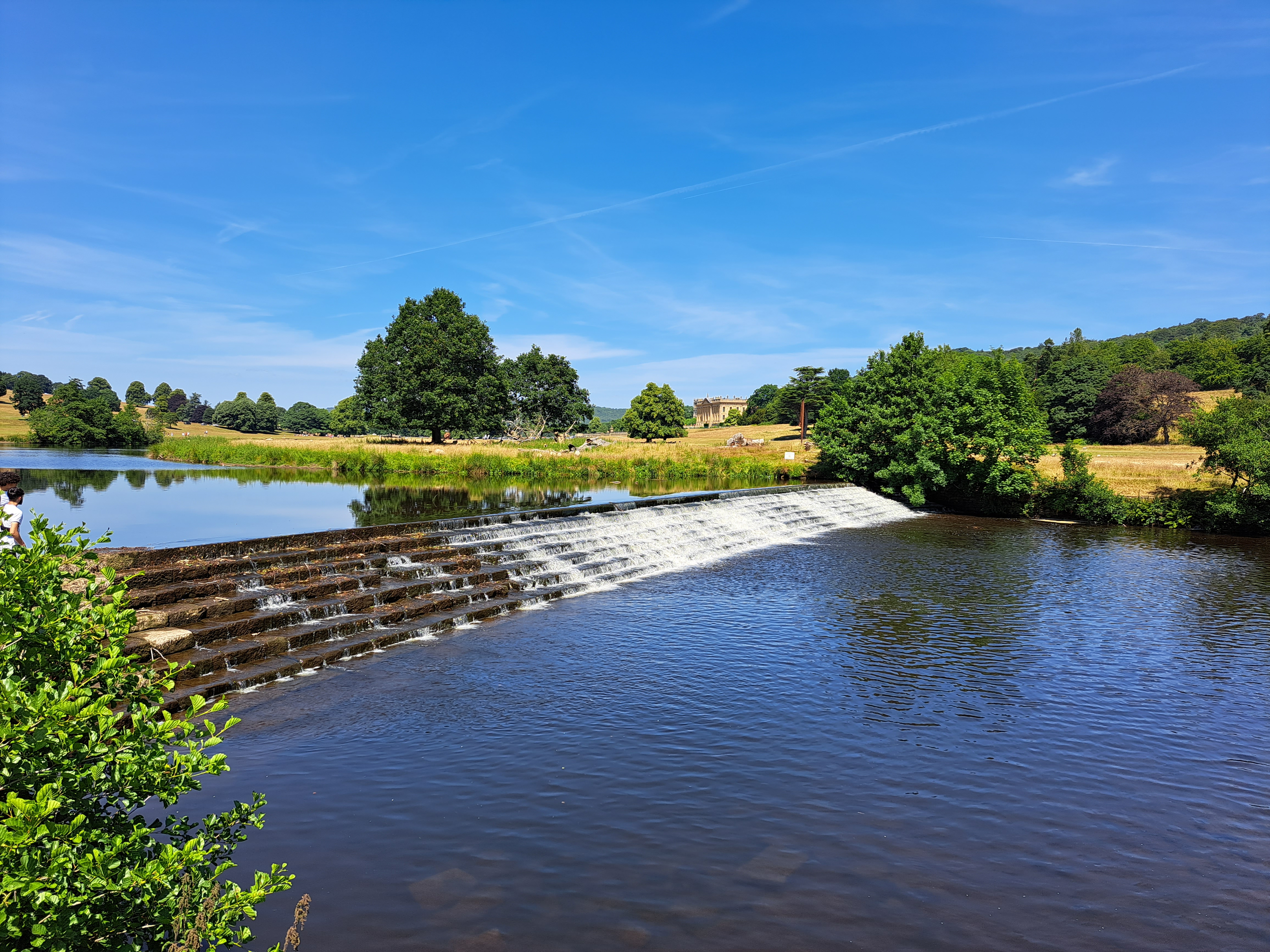
Weir in the river at Chatsworth House

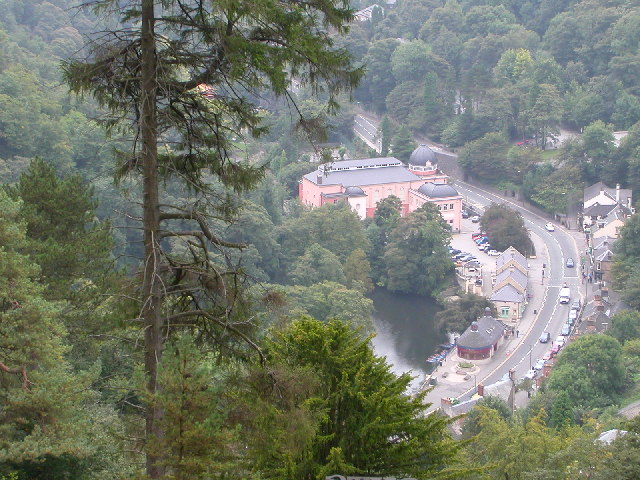
The river at Matlock Bath, as seen from the Heights of Abraham cable car

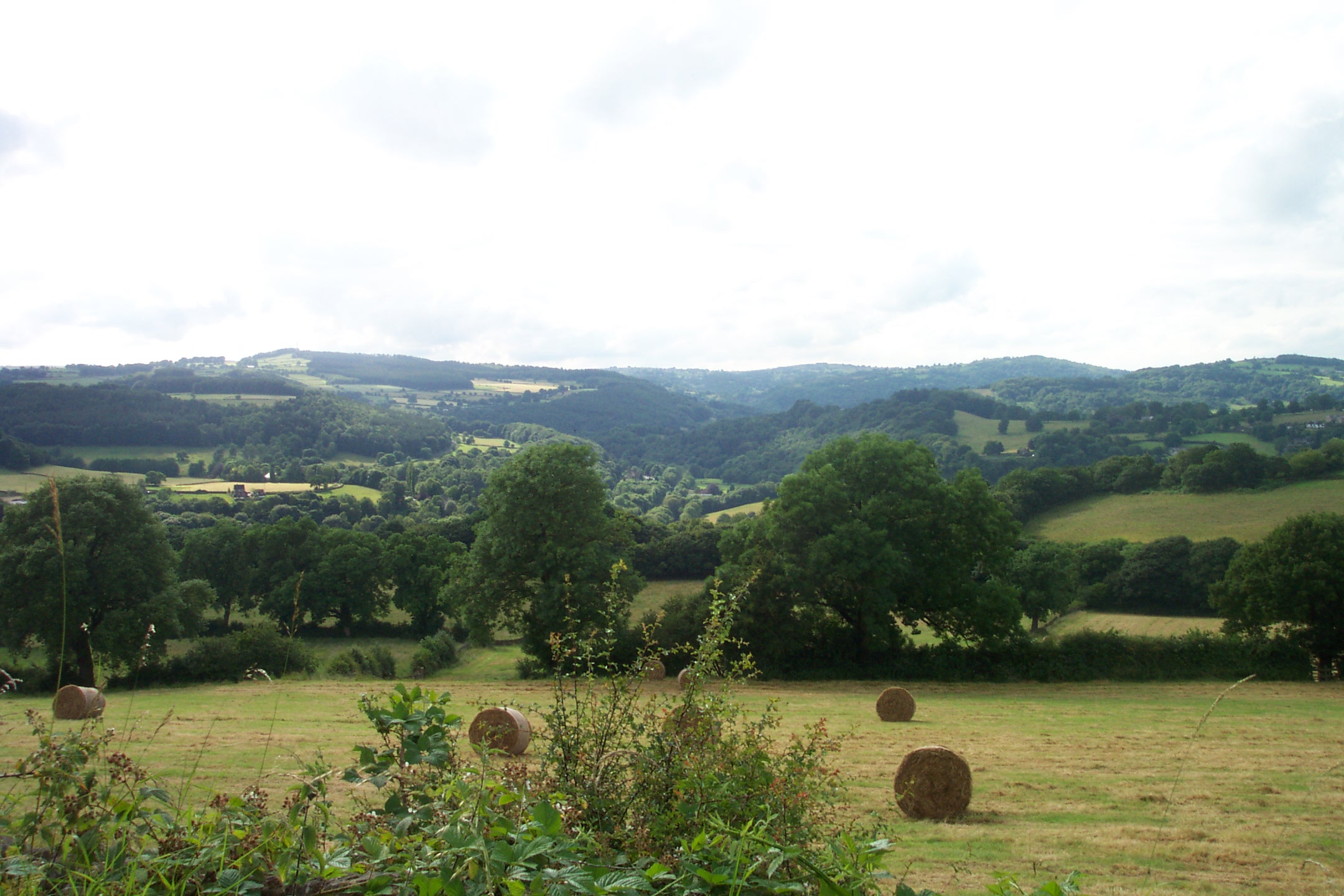
The valley of the Derwent upstream of Whatstandwell

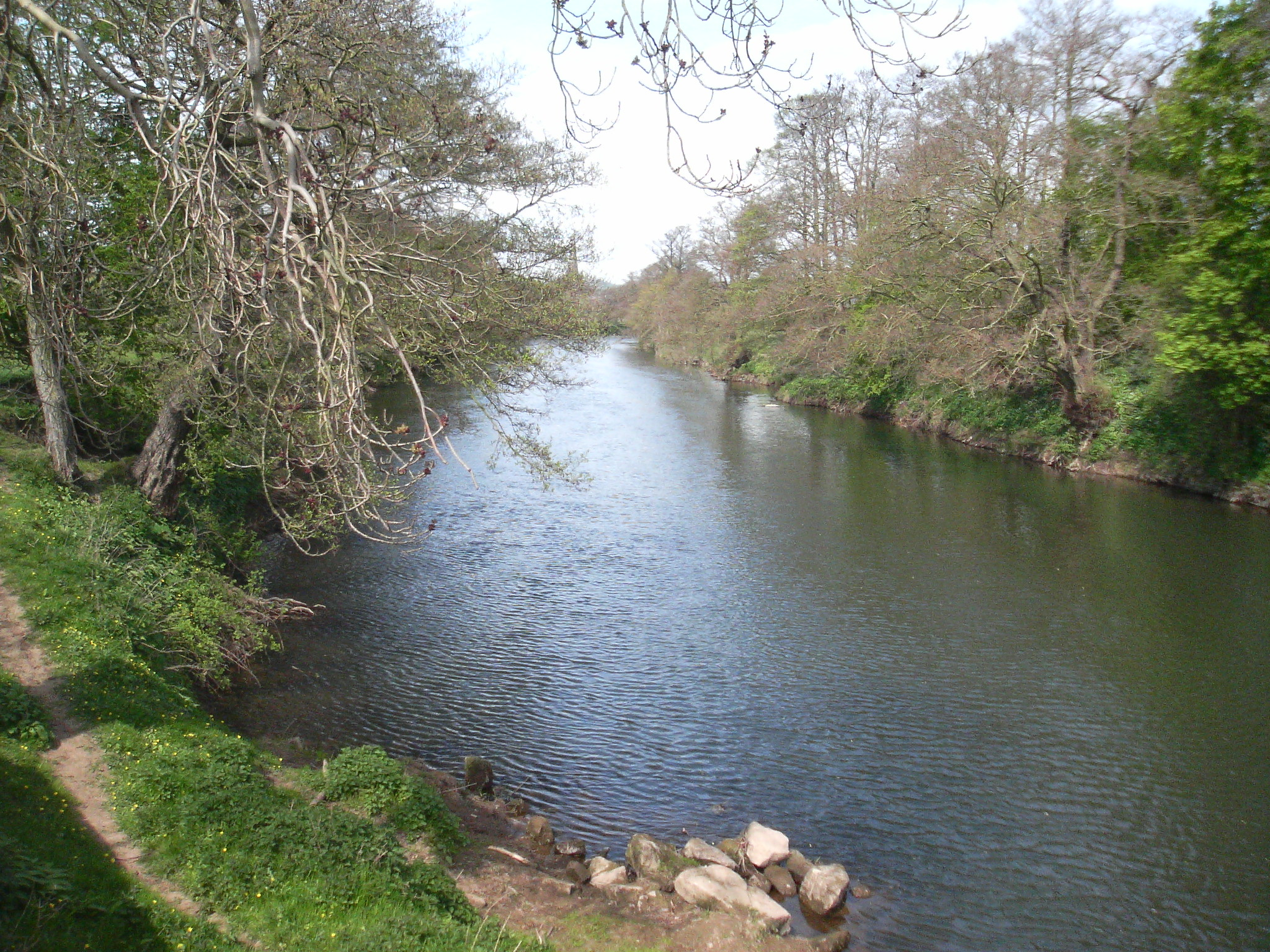
The river just south of Duffield

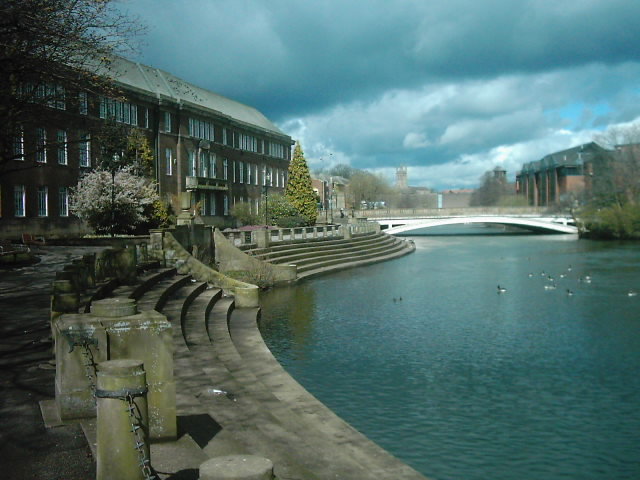
The river outside the Council House in Derby

== See also ==
- 2019 United Kingdom floods
- List of rivers in the Peak District
- List of rivers of England
- Rivers of the United Kingdom
- List of crossings of the River Derwent, Derbyshire
- Handyside Bridge
