= List of rivers discharging into the North Sea =

== Main affluents ==
The main affluents of North Sea, Skagerrak and Kattegat
Name	Mean; Discharge	Length	Basin	States	Course
Rhine	2900 m³/s (R-M-delta); 2300 m³/s (proper)	1238.8 km (with Hinterrhein); 1240 km (with Vorderrhein)	197,100 km^{2} (76,100 sq mi) (with Meuse)	Switzerland (sources), Liechtenstein, Austria, Germany, France, Netherlands, Luxembourg (Moselle), Italy (Reno di Lei)	smallest flow: Dischmabach → Landwasser → Albula → Hinterrhein (sum = 72 km) → Rhine longest course: Rein da Medel → Vorderrhein (sum = 74 km)→ Rhine
Elbe	870 m³/s	1094 km (nominally); 1245 km (hydrologically)	148,268 km^{2} (57,247 sq mi)	the Czech Republic (sources), Germany, Austria (Lainsitz), Poland (Dzika Orlica and smaller affluents)	longer and larger tributary Vltava
Glomma	698 m³/s	601 km	41,917 km^{2} (16,184 sq mi)	Norway, Sweden (affluents)	Glomma → lake Aursunden → Glomma → Skagerrak
Göta älv	575 m³/s	93 km (nominally); 720 km (hydrologically)	50,229.3 km^{2} (19,393.6 sq mi)	Sweden, Norway (Trysilelva)	Rogen → lake Femunden → Trysilelva → Klarälven → lake Vänern → Göta älv → Kattegat
IJssel	380 m³/s (75% from Rhine)	125 km (nominally); 188 km (with Oude IJssel)	4,533 km^{2} (1,750 sq mi)	Netherlands, Germany (source Oude IJssel)	Oude IJssel → IJssel → Ketelmeer → IJsselmeer → Wadden Sea
Meuse	357 m³/s	874 km	33,000 km^{2} (13,000 sq mi)	France (source), Belgium, Netherlands, Luxembourg (Chiers), Germany (Rur, S(ch)walm, Niers)	sharing mouths of the Rhine
Weser	327 m³/s	451.4 km (nominally); 751 km (with Werra)	41,094 km^{2} (15,866 sq mi)	Germany	formed by confluence of Werra (longer) and Fulda (larger)
Drammenselva	314 m³/s	48 km (nominally); 301 km (system)	17,110 km^{2} (6,610 sq mi)	Norway	… → Slidrefjorden → Strondafjorden → Aurdalsfjorden → Begna → Sperillen → Ådalselva → Randselva → Storelva → Tyrifjorden → Drammenselva → Oslofjord
Humber (estuary)	250 m³/s (without tide flows)	62 km (nominally); 359 km (with Trent)	24,240 km^{2} (9,360 sq mi)	England	common estuary of Trent and Ouse (see below)
Tay	170 m³/s	193 km	6,216 km^{2} (2,400 sq mi)	Scotland	River Tay → Firth of Tay (estuary, included in the figures)
Otra	150 m³/s	245 km	3,740 km^{2} (1,440 sq mi)	Norway	→ Skagerrak
Sira	130 m³/s	152 km	1,902 km^{2} (734 sq mi)	Norway	
Scheldt	127 m³/s	360 km	21,863 km^{2} (8,441 sq mi)	France (source), Belgium, Netherlands (estuary)	
River Forth	112 m³/s	47 km (nominally); 55 km (hydrologically)	1,029 km^{2} (397 sq mi)	Scotland	→ Firth of Forth
Numedalslågen	111 m³/s	352 km	5,554 km^{2} (2,144 sq mi)	Norway	→ Skagerrak
Trent	99 m³/s	297 km	10,452 km^{2} (4,036 sq mi)	England	→ Humber (see above)
Tweed	85 m³/s	156 km	1,080 km^{2} (420 sq mi)	Scotland (source), England	
Lagan	82 m³/s	244 km	6,451.8 km^{2} (2,491.1 sq mi)	Sweden	→ Kattegat
Ems	80.5 m³/s	371 km	13,160 km^{2} (5,080 sq mi)	Germany, Netherlands (estuary)	
Thames	65.8 m³/s	346 km	12,935 km^{2} (4,994 sq mi)	England	
Spey	64 m³/s	173 km	3,008 km^{2} (1,161 sq mi)	Scotland	→ Moray Firth
Ätran	52.5 m³/s	243 km	3,342.2 km^{2} (1,290.4 sq mi)	Sweden	→ Kattegat
Zwarte Water	50 m³/s	19 km (nominally); 201 km (with Vecht)	5,741 km^{2} (2,217 sq mi)	Germany (source), Netherlands	Vecht/Vechte → Zwarte Water → Zwarte Meer → IJsselmeer → Wadden Sea
River Tyne	44.6 m³/s	321.4 km	2,200 km^{2} (850 sq mi)	England	
Yorkshire Ouse	44 m³/s	208 km (with Ure)	3,315 km^{2} (1,280 sq mi)	England	Ure → Ouse → Humber (see above)
Nissan	41 m³/s	200 km	2,686 km^{2} (1,037 sq mi)	Sweden	→ Kattegat
Skjern Å	36.6 m³/s	94 km	2,100 km^{2} (810 sq mi)	Denmark	→ Ringkøbing Fjord (lagoon)
Great Ouse	35 m³/s	270 km	8,530 km^{2} (3,290 sq mi)	England	→ The Wash
Gudenå	32.4 m³/s	149 km	2,643 km^{2} (1,020 sq mi)	Denmark	→ Kattegat

== Long list ==
=== Austrian drainage basin ===
- Elbe (near Cuxhaven, Germany)
  - Vltava (in Mělník, Czech Republic)
    - Lužnice (in Týn nad Vltavou, Czech Republic)
- Rhine (main branch at Hook of Holland, Netherlands)
  - Bregenzer Ach (into Lake Constance in Bregenz)
  - Dornbirner Ach (into Lake Constance near Bregenz)
  - Ill (near Feldkirch)

=== Belgian drainage basin ===
- Yser (in Nieuwpoort) – France, Belgium

=== Czech drainage basin ===
- Elbe (near Cuxhaven, Germany)
  - Ploučnice (in Děčín)
  - Ohře (in Litoměřice)
  - Vltava (in Mělník)
    - Berounka (in Prague)
      - Střela (in Liblín)
      - Radbuza (in Plzeň)
        - Úhlava (in Plzeň)
      - Mže (in Plzeň)
    - Sázava (in Davle)
      - Želivka (in Soutice)
    - Otava (in Zvíkovské Podhradí)
    - Lužnice (in Týn nad Vltavou)
      - Nežárka (in Veselí nad Lužnicí)
  - Jizera (in Lázně Toušeň)
  - Chrudimka (in Pardubice)
  - Orlice (in Hradec Králové)
    - Tichá Orlice (in Žďár nad Orlicí)
    - Divoká Orlice (in Žďár nad Orlicí)

=== Danish drainage basins ===
- Gudenå (into Kattegat near Randers)
- Skjern Å (near Skjern)

=== English drainage basins ===
==== Flowing into the North Sea – Thames and Medway ====
From Foreness Point to Shoeburyness

- River Medway (shares the Thames estuary)
  - River Beult
  - River Teise
    - River Bewl
  - River Eden, Kent
  - River Bourne, Kent
  - River Len
  - Loose Stream
  - East Malling Stream
  - Wateringbury Stream
- River Thames (From Oxford up to its source, the Thames is also known as the River Isis)
  - River Darent
    - River Cray
      - River Shuttle
        - Danson Stream
        - Wyncham Stream
          - Longlands Stream
  - River Ingrebourne (tidal reach known as Rainham Creek)
  - River Beam (downstream name for River Rom)
    - The Ravensbourne
  - Wogebourne (lower reach known as Crossway Canal)
  - River Roding (tidal reach known as Barking Creek)
  - River Lea (or Lee)
    - River Moselle (mostly subterranean, original tributary of Lee, now empties into Pymme's Brook)
    - The Hackney Brook (subterranean, and probably now diverted to the Thames)
    - River Beane
      - River Rib
    - River Mimram
  - River Ravensbourne (tidal reach known as Deptford Creek)
    - Spring Brook
    - River Pool
      - River Beck
      - Chaffinch Brook
    - River Quaggy (upper reaches known as Kyd Brook)
      - Quaggy Hither Green
      - Middle Kid Brooke
      - Lower Kid Brooke
      - Little Quaggy
        - Fairy Hall Flow
      - Grove Park Ditch
      - Border Ditch
      - Milk Street Ditch
        - Halls Farm Ditch
      - Petts Wood Ditch
      - East Branch
      - Main Branch
  - River Neckinger (See also Subterranean rivers of London for this and the others marked 'subterranean' below)
  - Walbrook (subterranean)
  - River Fleet (subterranean, also known as the Holbourne)
  - River Effra (subterranean)
  - River Tyburn (subterranean)
  - Falconbrook (subterranean)
  - River Westbourne (subterranean)
    - Tyburn Brook (subterranean)
  - Counter's Creek (subterranean)
  - River Wandle
    - River Graveney
  - Beverley Brook
    - Pyl Brook
  - Stamford Brook (subterranean – tidal reach known as Hammersmith Creek)
  - Bollar or Bollo Brook (subterranean)
  - River Brent
    - Dollis Brook
  - Duke of Northumberland's River
  - River Crane
  - Hogsmill River
  - The Rythe
  - River Ember
    - River Mole
  - Longford River
  - River Ash
  - River Wey
    - River Tillingbourne
    - River Ock, Surrey
  - River Bourne, north branch
  - River Bourne, south branch
  - River Colne
    - Wraysbury River
    - Frays River
      - River Pinn
    - River Misbourne
    - River Chess
    - River Gade
      - River Bulbourne
    - River Ver
  - Colne Brook
  - The Cut
  - River Wye
  - River Loddon
    - St Patrick's Stream
    - Twyford Brook
    - Emm Brook
    - River Blackwater
      - River Whitewater
        - River Hart
      - Wish Stream
      - Cove Brook
  - River Kennet
    - Foudry Brook
    - River Enborne
    - River Lambourn
    - River Dun
    - River Og
  - River Pang
    - River Bourne
  - River Thame
  - River Ock
  - River Cherwell
    - River Ray
    - River Swere
  - River Evenlode
    - River Glyme
      - River Dorn
  - River Windrush
  - River Cole
  - River Leach
  - River Coln
  - River Ray
  - River Key
  - River Churn

==== Flowing into the North Sea – North of the Thames Estuary ====
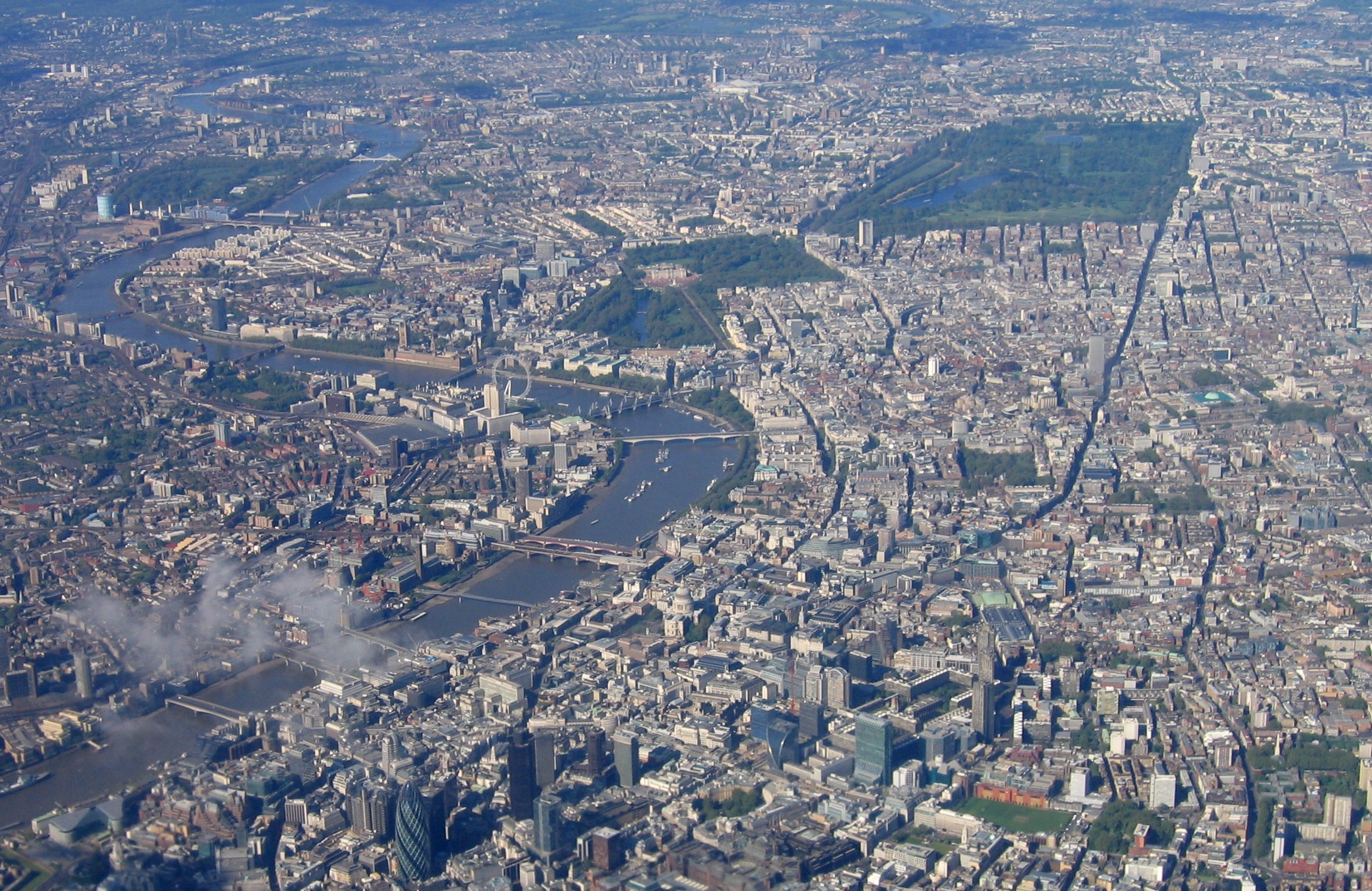
Aerial view of the Thames in London

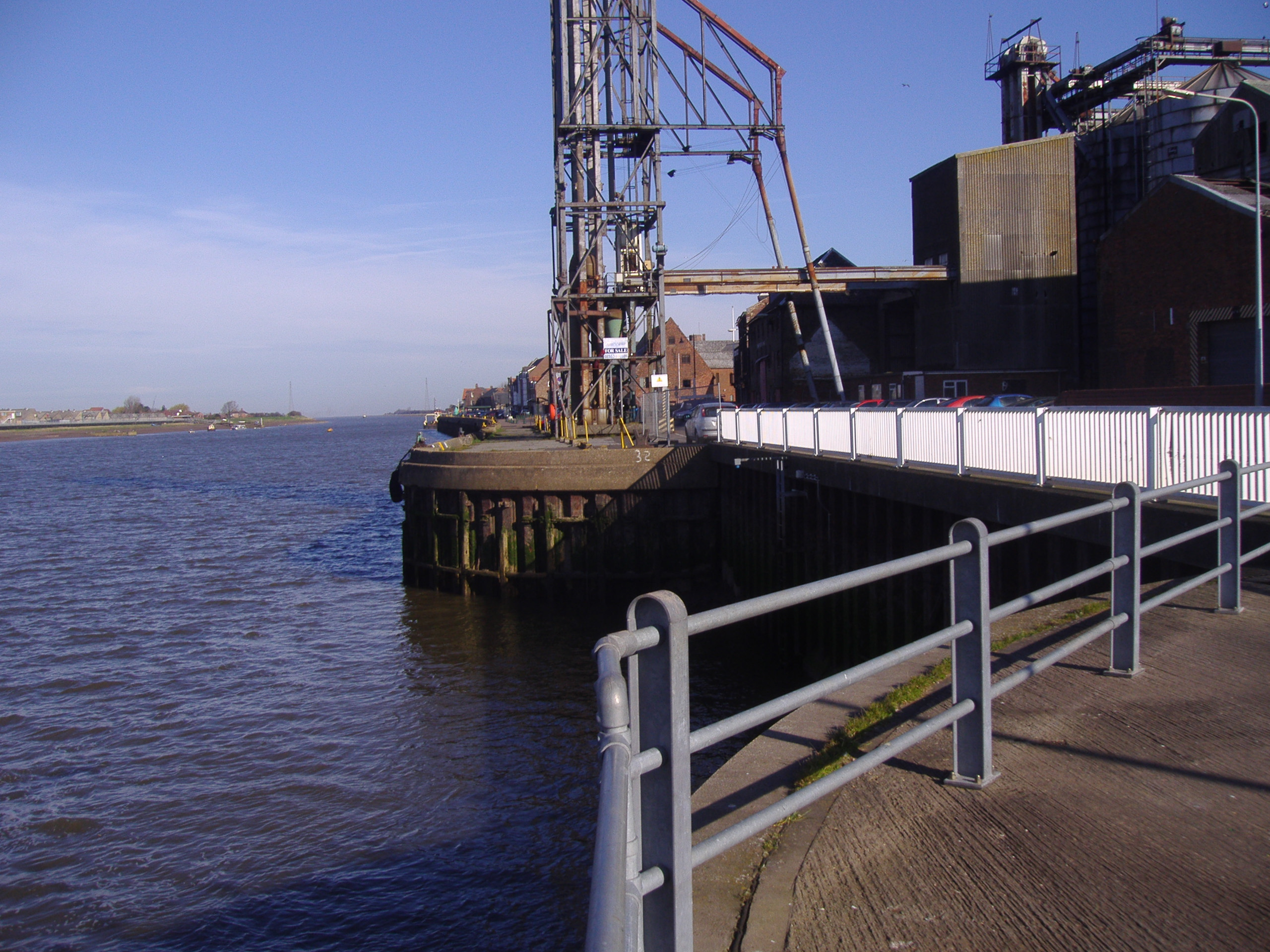
The mouth of the Gaywood River at King's Lynn.

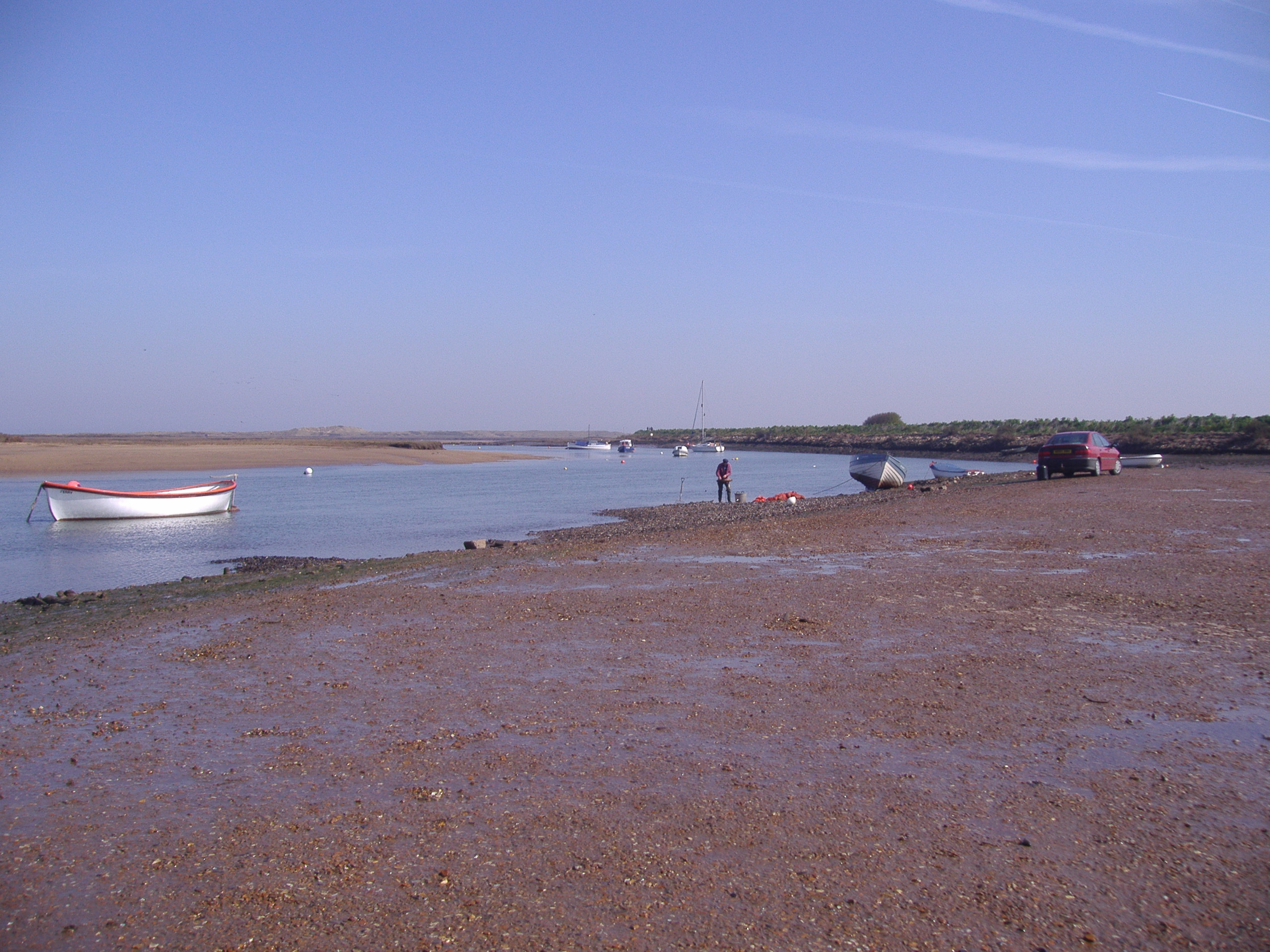
The Mouth of the River Burn at Overy Creek, Norfolk

From Shoeburyness to St Abb's Head

- River Crouch
  - River Roach
    - Prittle Brook
- River Blackwater
  - River Chelmer
    - River Ter
  - River Brain
- River Colne
- River Stour
- River Orwell
    - River Gipping
- River Deben
- River Alde/River Ore
- Minsmere River
- River Blyth
- River Yox
- River Yare
  - River Bure
    - River Thurne
    - River Ant
  - River Waveney

River Hundred (Benacre, Kessingland

  - River Chet
  - River Wensum
  - River Tas
- River Burn
- River Great Ouse
  - Babingley River
  - River Nar
  - River Wissey
  - River Little Ouse
    - River Thet
  - River Lark
  - River Cam
  - River Ivel
    - River Hiz
  - River Ouzel or Lovat
  - River Tove
- River Nene
  - River Ise
  - Willow Brook
- River Welland
  - Whaplode River
  - New River
  - Car Dyke (Peterborough)
  - Eye Brook
  - River Chater
  - River Gwash
  - Vernatt's Drain
    - South Drove Drain
  - River Glen
    - West Glen River
    - East Glen River
    - Bourne Eau
  - Risegate Eau
- Boston Haven
  - South Forty-Foot Drain
    - Hammond Beck
    - North Forty Foot Drain
    - Clay Dike
    - Skerth Drain
  - River Witham
    - River Slea
    - Billinghay Skirth
    - River Brant
    - Fossdyke Navigation
      - River Till
    - River Bain
      - River Waring
    - Newham Drain
      - Castle Dike
  - Maud Foster Drain
    - West Fen Drain
      - Medlam Drain
    - Stone Bridge Drain
      - West Fen Catchwater Drain
      - East Fen Catchwater Drain
  - Hobhole Drain
    - Cowbridge Drain
    - Bell Water Drain
    - Fodder Dike
- Steeping River
  - River Lymn
  - Cow Bank Drain
- Saltfleet Haven
  - Great Eau
    - Long Eau
    - Mar Dike
  - South Dike
- Grainthorpe Haven
  - River Lud Canalised and diverted as Louth Navigation.
- Tetney Haven
  - Louth Navigation
    - Waithe Beck
- Humber estuary
  - Buck Beck
  - River Freshney
  - East Halton Beck
  - The Beck
  - River Ancholme
    - West Drain
  - Halton Drain
  - River Trent
    - Pauper's Drain
    - River Torne
    - River Eau
    - River Idle
      - River Maun
      - River Meden
      - River Ryton
    - River Devon
    - River Greet
    - River Leen
    - River Erewash
    - River Soar
      - River Wreake
      - River Sence
    - River Derwent
      - River Amber
      - River Wye
        - River Lathkill
          - River Bradford
      - River Noe
      - River Ashop
        - River Alport
      - River Westend
    - River Dove
      - River Manifold
        - River Hamps
    - River Tame
      - River Blythe
        - River Cole
      - River Rea
      - River Anker
    - River Sow
      - River Penk
  - River Ouse
    - Swinefleet Warping Drain
    - River Don
      - River Rother
        - River Doe Lea
        - River Hipper
        - River Drone
      - River Sheaf
        - Porter Brook
        - Meers Brook
      - River Rivelin
      - River Loxley
      - River Little Don
      - River Dearne
        - River Dove
      - River Went
    - River Aire
      - River Worth
      - River Calder
        - River Colne
          - River Holme
        - River Hebble
    - River Derwent
      - River Rye
        - River Seven
        - River Dove
        - River Riccal
      - River Hertford
    - River Wharfe
      - River Dibb
      - River Skirfare
      - River Washburn
    - River Foss
    - River Nidd
    - River Ure
      - River Swale
        - Cod Beck
        - River Wiske
      - River Cover
      - River Bain
  - River Hull
  - Sands Drain
  - Winestead Drain
- Gypsey Race
- Sea Cut (Scalby Beck)
- River Esk
  - Iburndale Beck
    - Little Beck
      - May Beck
- Skelton Beck
- River Tees
  - River Leven
  - River Skerne
  - River Greta
  - River Balder
  - River Lune
- River Wear
  - River Browney
    - River Deerness
  - River Gaunless
- River Tyne
  - River South Tyne
    - River Allen
      - River East Allen
      - River West Allen
    - Haltwhistle Burn
  - River North Tyne
    - Warks Burn
    - Chirdon Burn
    - Lewis Burn
  - Devil's Water
  - River Derwent
  - River Team
- River Blyth
- River Wansbeck
  - River Font
- River Coquet
- River Aln
- River Tweed
  - Whiteadder Water, Scotland
    - Blackadder Water, Scotland
  - River Till
    - River Glen
  - Eden Water, Scotland
  - River Teviot, Scotland
  - Leader Water, Scotland
  - Gala Water, Scotland
  - Ettrick Water, Scotland
  - Leithen Water, Scotland
  - Quair Water, Scotland
  - Eddleston Water, Scotland
  - Manor Water, Scotland
  - Holms Water, Scotland

=== French drainage basin ===
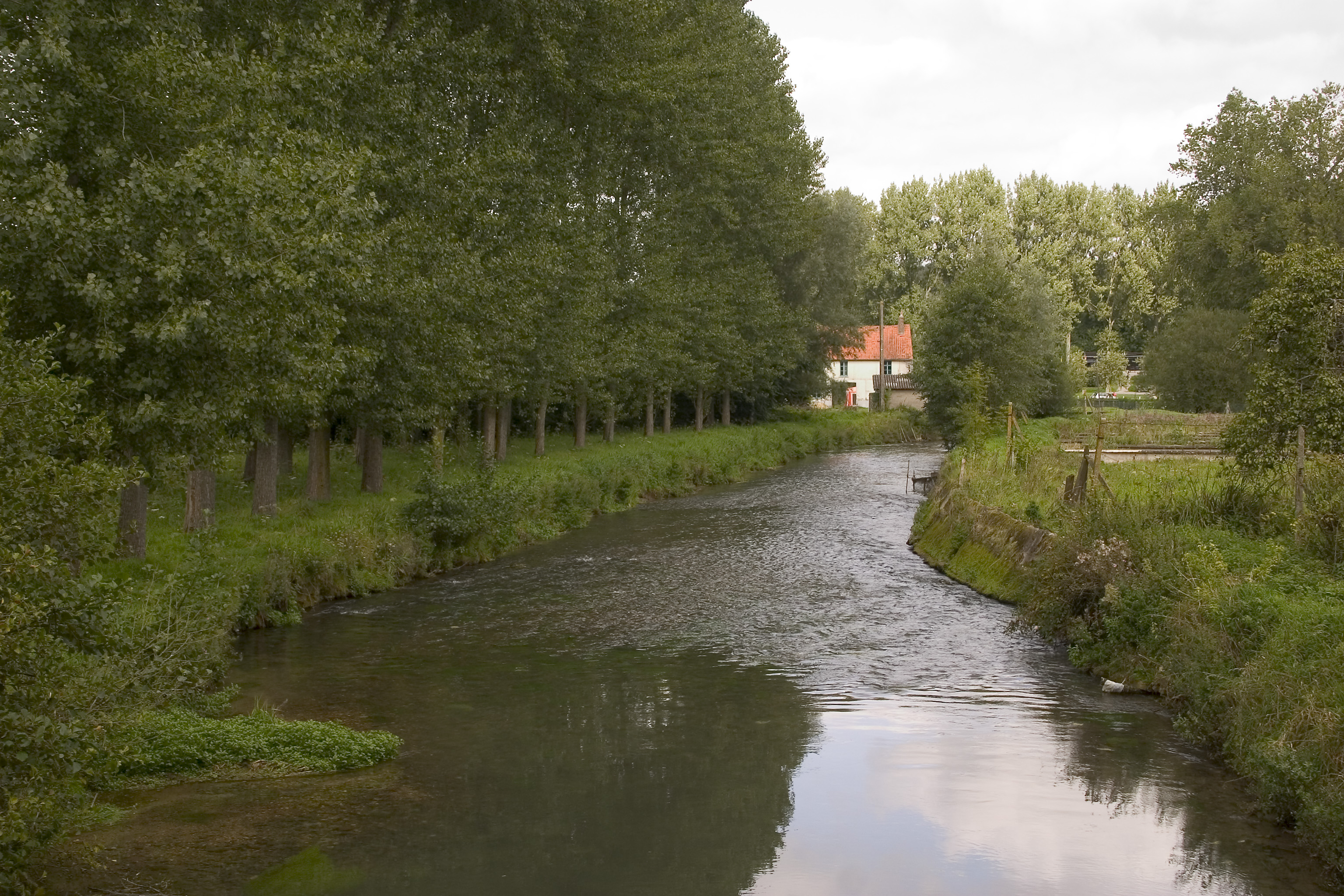
The Aa

The Aa is an 89 km long river in northern France. Its source is near the village Bourthes. It flows through the départements and cities of Pas-de-Calais: Saint-Omer and Nord: Gravelines.

- Aa (in Gravelines)

=== German drainage basin ===
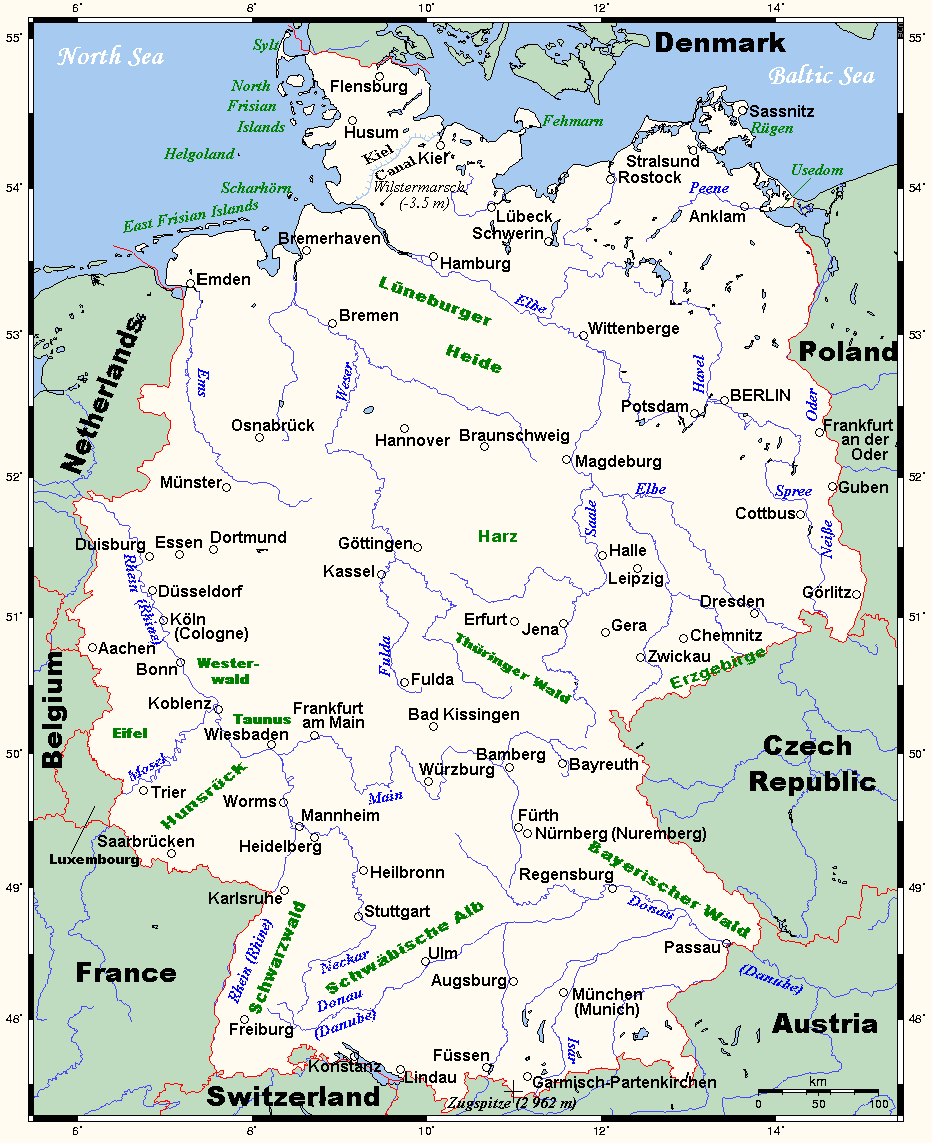
The major German rivers

The three main rivers in Germany are the Rhine (German: Rhein) (main tributaries including the Neckar, the Main and the Moselle (Mosel)); the Elbe (also drains into the North Sea); and, the Danube (Donau).

==== German rivers draining into the North Sea ====
The rivers in this section are sorted south-west (Netherlands) to east (Danish border).

- Meuse German: Maas (main branch at Stellendam, Netherlands)
  - Niers (in Gennep, Netherlands)
  - Rur/Roer (in Roermond, Netherlands)
    - Wurm (near Heinsberg)
    - Inde (in Jülich)
- Rhine/Rhein (main branch at Hook of Holland, Netherlands)
  - Lippe (in Wesel)
    - Alme (in Paderborn)
  - Emscher (near Dinslaken)
  - Ruhr (in Duisburg)
    - Volme (near Hagen)
    - Lenne (near Hagen)
    - Möhne (in Neheim-Hüsten)
  - Erft (in Neuss)
  - Wupper/Wipper (in Leverkusen)
  - Sieg (in Bonn)
    - Agger (in Siegburg)
    - Nister (in Wissen)
  - Ahr (near Sinzig)
  - Wied (in Neuwied)
    - Mehrbach (near Asbach)
    - Aubach (in Neuwied)
      - Engelsbach (Aubach) (in Neuwied)
  - Moselle (in Koblenz)
    - Elzbach (in Moselkern)
    - Alf (in Alf)
    - Lieser (near Bernkastel-Kues)
    - Salm (near Klüsserath)
    - Kyll (near Trier-Ehrang)
    - Saar (near Konz)
      - Nied (near Rehlingen-Siersburg)
      - Prims (in Dillingen)
      - Blies (in Sarreguemines)
        - Schwarzbach (near Zweibrücken)
    - Sauer (in Wasserbillig)
      - Prüm (near Echternach)
        - Nims (in Irrel)
      - Our (in Wallendorf)
  - Lahn (in Lahnstein)
    - Aar (in Diez)
    - Weil (in Weilburg)
    - Dill (in Wetzlar)
    - Ohm (in Cölbe)
  - Nahe (in Bingen)
    - Alsenz (near Bad Kreuznach)
    - Glan (near Bad Sobernheim)
  - Selz (in Ingelheim)
  - Main (in Mainz)
    - Nidda (in Frankfurt-Höchst)
      - Wetter (in Niddatal)
    - Kinzig (in Hanau)
    - Tauber (in Wertheim am Main)
    - Franconian Saale (in Gemünden am Main)
    - Regnitz (in Bamberg)
      - Pegnitz (in Fürth)
      - Rednitz (in Fürth)
        - Franconian Rezat (in Georgensgmünd)
        - Swabian Rezat (in Georgensgmünd)
    - Itz (in Baunach)
    - Red Main (near Kulmbach)
  - Neckar (in Mannheim)
    - Jagst (near Bad Friedrichshall)
    - Kocher (in Bad Friedrichshall)
    - Enz (in Besigheim)
    - Murr (in Marbach am Neckar)
    - Rems (in Remseck)
    - Fils (in Plochingen)
  - Queich (near Germersheim)
  - Pfinz (near Germersheim)
  - Lauter (in Lauterbourg)
  - Murg (near Rastatt)
  - Sauer (in Seltz, France)
  - Acher (near Lichtenau)
  - Rench (near Lichtenau)
  - Kinzig (near Kehl)
  - Elz (near Lahr)
  - Wiese (near Basel)
  - Wutach (in Waldshut-Tiengen)
- IJssel (into the IJsselmeer near Kampen, Netherlands)
  - Berkel (in Zutphen, Netherlands)
  - Oude IJssel/Issel (in Doesburg, Netherlands)
- Zwarte Water (into the IJsselmeer near Genemuiden, Netherlands)
  - Vechte (near Zwolle, Netherlands)
    - Dinkel (in Neuenhaus)
- Ems (near Delfzijl, Netherlands)
  - Hase (in Meppen)
- Weser (near Bremerhaven)
  - Hunte (in Elsfleth)
  - Lesum (in Bremen-Vegesack)
    - Wümme (in Ritterhude)
  - Aller (near Verden (Aller))
    - Böhme (near Rethem)
    - Leine (near Schwarmstedt)
      - Innerste (near Sarstedt)
      - Rhume (in Northeim)
        - Oder (Harz) (in Katlenburg-Lindau)
    - Örtze (in Winsen an der Aller)
    - Fuhse (in Celle)
    - Oker (in Müden (Aller))
      - Schunter (near Braunschweig)
  - Werre (in Bad Oeynhausen)
  - Diemel (in Bad Karlshafen)
  - Fulda (in Hannoversch Münden)
    - Eder (in Edermünde)
      - Schwalm (near Fritzlar)
    - Haune (in Bad Hersfeld)
  - Werra (in Hannoversch Münden)
    - Hörsel (near Eisenach)
    - Ulster (in Philippsthal)

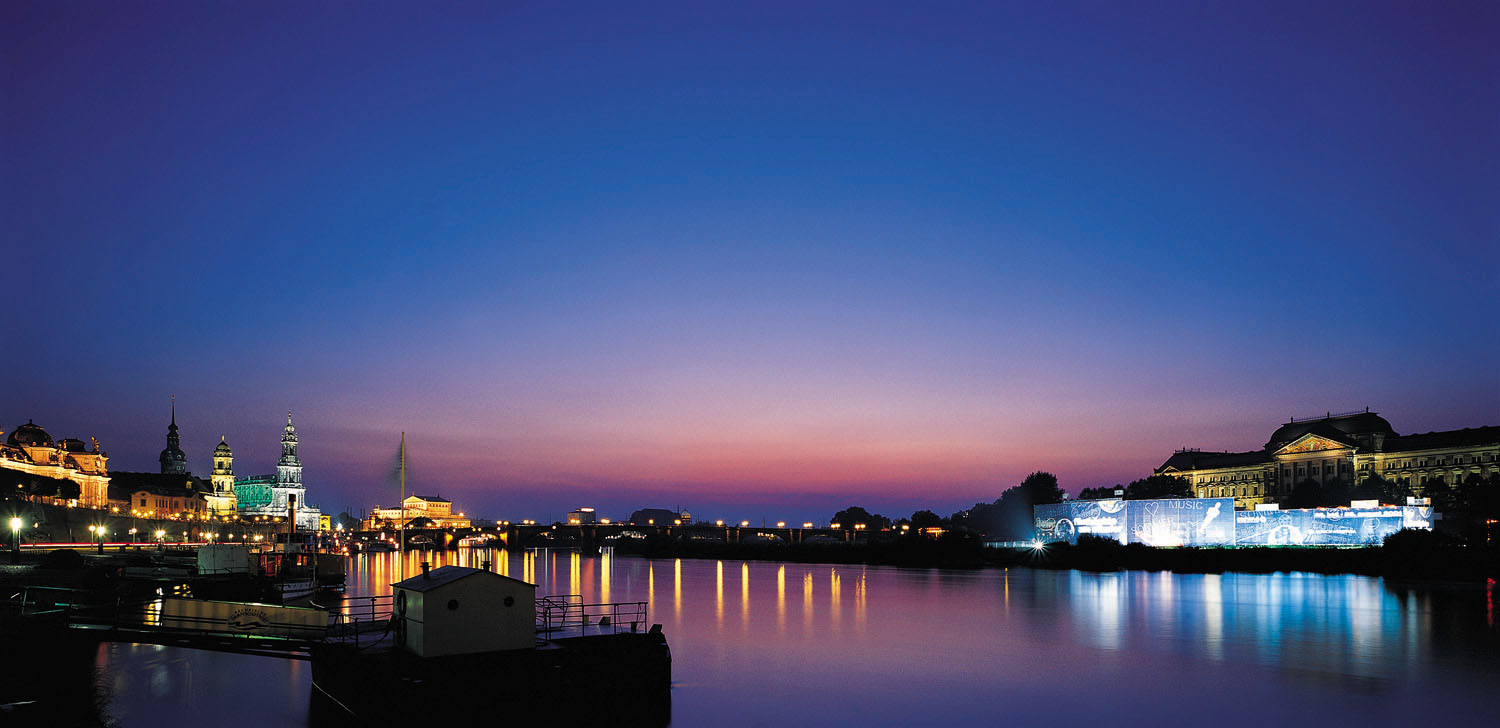
The Elbe at Dresden

- Elbe (near Cuxhaven)
  - Oste (near Otterndorf)
  - Stör (near Glückstadt)
  - Alster (in Hamburg)
  - Bille (near Hamburg)
  - Ilmenau (near Winsen (Luhe))
  - Jeetzel (in Hitzacker)
  - Löcknitz (near Dömitz)
    - Elde (near Lenzen)
  - Aland (in Schnackenburg)
  - Stepenitz (in Wittenberge)
  - Havel (near Havelberg)
    - Dosse (near Havelberg)
    - Rhin (near Warnau)
    - Plane (near Brandenburg)
    - Nuthe (in Potsdam)
    - Spree (in Berlin-Spandau)
      - Dahme (in Berlin-Köpenick)
  - Ohre (near Magdeburg)
  - Saale (in Barby)
    - Bode (in Nienburg (Saale))
    - Wipper (Saale) (near Bernburg)
    - White Elster (near Halle (Saale))
      - Parthe (in Leipzig)
      - Pleiße (in Leipzig)
      - Weida (near Gera)
    - Unstrut (near Naumburg)
      - Wipper (Unstrut) (near Heldrungen)
      - Gera (in Straußfurt)
    - Ilm (in Großheringen)
    - Schwarza (in Schwarza)
  - Mulde (in Dessau)
    - Zwickauer Mulde (near Colditz)
      - Chemnitz (near Wechselburg)
    - Freiberger Mulde (near Colditz)
      - Zschopau (near Döbeln)
  - Black Elster (near Wittenberg)
  - Weißeritz (in Dresden)
    - Wilde Weißeritz (in Freital)
  - Wesenitz (in Pirna)
  - Ohře (in Litoměřice, Czech Republic)
  - Vltava (in Mělník, Czech Republic)
    - Berounka (in Prague, Czech Republic)
      - Mže (in Plzeň, Czech Republic)
- Eider (in Tönning)
  - Treene (in Friedrichstadt)

=== Netherlands drainage basin ===
- Zwarte Water (into IJsselmeer near Genemuiden) – Netherlands
  - Vecht (Overijssel)/Vechte (near Zwolle)
    - Regge (near Ommen)
    - Dinkel (in Neuenhaus)
- IJssel (into IJsselmeer near Kampen) – Netherlands
  - Berkel (in Zutphen)
  - Oude IJssel (in Doesburg)
  - branch of the river Rhine (near Pannerden)

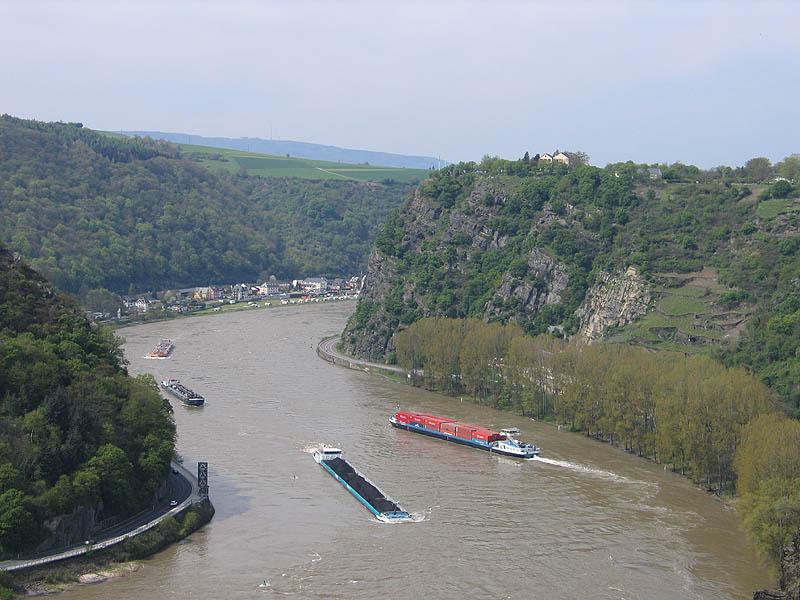
The Rhine at the Lorelei

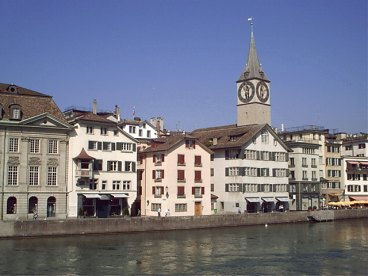
Limmat in Zurich

- Rhine/Rhein (main branch at Hook of Holland) – Switzerland, Liechtenstein, Austria, Germany, France, Belgium, Netherlands
  - Linge (in Gorinchem)
  - Lippe (in Wesel)
  - Emscher (near Dinslaken)
  - Ruhr (in Duisburg)
    - Lenne (near Hagen)
  - Düssel (in Düsseldorf)
  - Erft (in Neuss)
  - Wupper (in Leverkusen)
  - Sieg (in Bonn)
  - Ahr (near Sinzig)
  - Wied (in Neuwied)
    - Mehrbach (near Asbach)
    - Aubach (in Neuwied)
      - Engelsbach (Aubach) (in Neuwied)
  - Moselle (in Koblenz)
    - Kyll (near Trier-Ehrang)
    - Ruwer (near Trier-Ruwer)
    - Saar (near Konz)
      - Nied (near Rehlingen-Siersburg)
    - Sauer (in Wasserbillig)
      - Prüm (near Echternach)
      - Our (in Wallendorf)
      - Alzette (in Ettelbruck)
    - Seille (in Metz)
    - Meurthe (in Frouard)
    - Madon (in Neuves-Maisons)
    - Vologne (near Éloyes)
    - Moselotte (in Remiremont)
  - Lahn (in Lahnstein)
    - Ohm (in Cölbe)
  - Nahe (in Bingen)
  - Main (in Mainz)
    - Nidda (in Frankfurt-Höchst)
    - Kinzig (in Hanau)
    - Tauber (in Wertheim am Main)
    - Franconian Saale (in Gemünden)
    - Regnitz (in Bamberg)
      - Pegnitz (river) (in Fürth)
      - Rednitz (in Fürth)
  - Neckar (in Mannheim)
    - Jagst (near Bad Friedrichshall)
    - Kocher (in Bad Friedrichshall)
    - Enz (in Besigheim)
    - Fils (in Plochingen)
  - Lauter (in Lauterbourg)
  - Murg (near Rastatt)
  - Ill (near Strasbourg)
  - Kinzig (near Kehl)
  - Elz (near Lahr)
  - Wiese (in Basel)
  - Aare (in Koblenz)
    - Limmat (in Brugg)
    - Reuss (in Brugg)
    - Emme (near Solothurn)
    - Saane/Sarine (near Bern)
  - Thur (near Schaffhausen)
  - Ill (near Feldkirch)
  - Vorderrhein (near Chur)
  - Hinterrhein (near Chur)

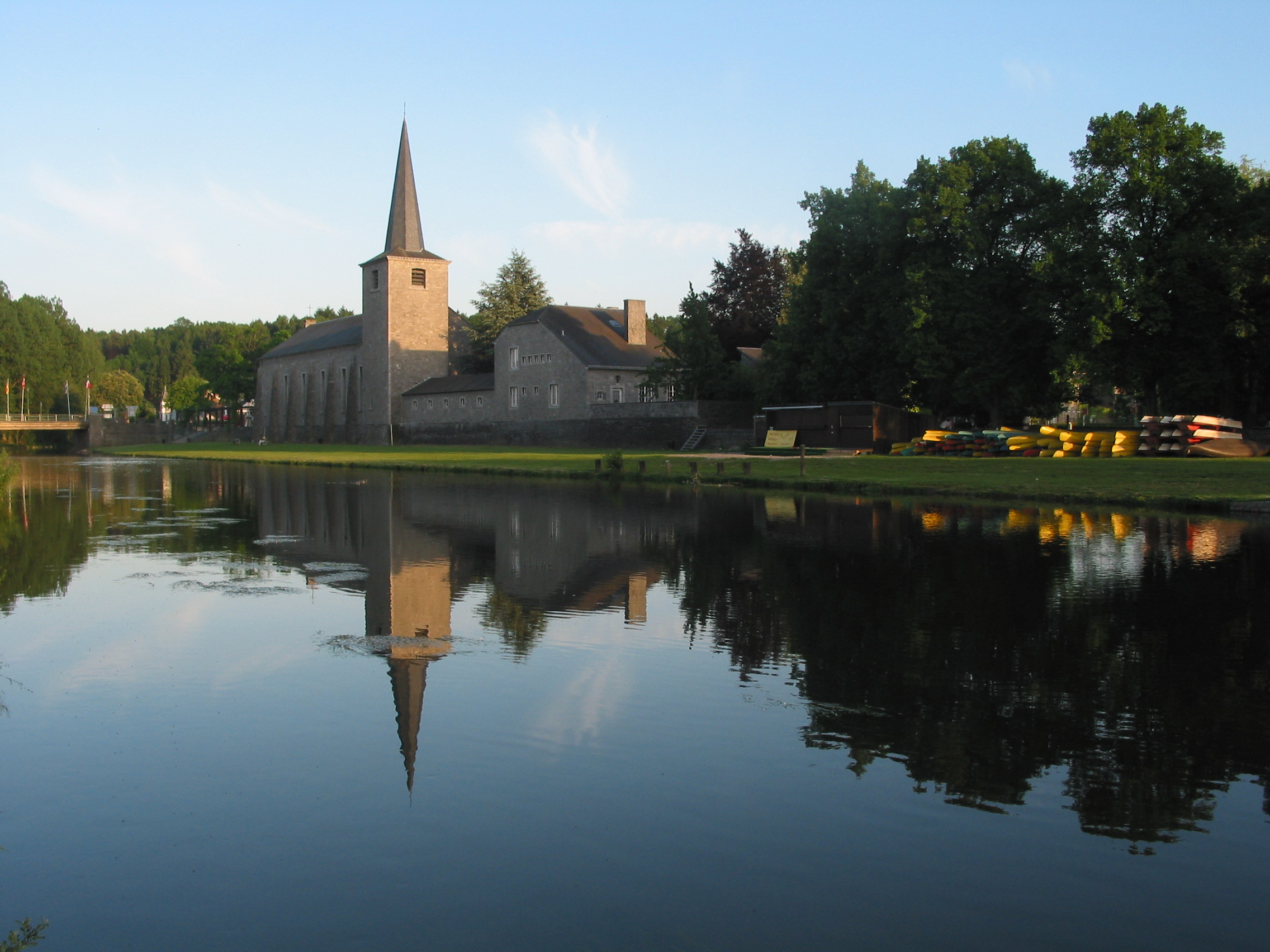
Hotton, view on the Ourthe and the city church.

- Meuse/Maas (main branch near Hellevoetsluis) – France, Belgium, Netherlands
  - Dieze (near 's-Hertogenbosch)
    - Aa (in 's-Hertogenbosch)
    - Dommel (in 's-Hertogenbosch)
  - Niers (in Gennep)
  - Swalm (in Swalmen)
  - Rur/Roer (in Roermond)
    - Wurm (near Heinsberg)
    - Inde (in Jülich)
  - Geul (near Meerssen)
  - Jeker/Geer (in Maastricht)
  - Ourthe (in Liège)
    - Vesdre (near Liège)
    - Amblève (in Comblain-au-Pont)
      - Salm (in Trois-Ponts)
  - Sambre (in Namur)
  - Lesse (in Dinant-Anseremme)
  - Viroin (in Vireux-Molhain)
  - Semois/Semoy (in Monthermé)
  - Bar (near Dom-le-Mesnil)
  - Chiers (in Bazeilles)

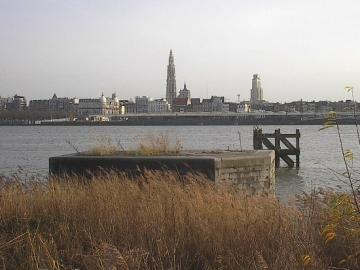
The Scheldt in Antwerp

- Scheldt/Schelde/Escaut (near Vlissingen) – France, Belgium, Netherlands
  - Rupel (in Rupelmonde)
    - Nete (in Rumst)
    - Dijle (in Rumst)
      - Zenne (in Mechelen)
      - Demer (in Rotselaar)
  - Durme (in Temse)
  - Dender (in Dendermonde)
    - Mark (near Lessines)
  - Leie (in Ghent)
    - Deûle (in Deûlémont)
  - Scarpe (Mortagne-du-Nord)
  - Haine (in Condé-sur-l'Escaut)

=== Norwegian drainage basin ===
- Otta (in Innlandet into Gudbrandsdalslågen at Otta)
- Gudbrandsdalslågen (into Lake Mjøsa in Oppland)
- Vorma (out of Lake Mjøsa into Glomma at Årnes)
- Glomma (into Oslofjord at Fredrikstad)
- Renaelva (in Innlandet into Glomma at Rena)
- Numedalslågen (in Larvik, Vestfold)
- Hallingdalselva (through Hallingdal into Lake Krøderen, Buskerud)
- Begna (in Buskerud)
- Dramselva (into Oslofjord in Drammen, Buskerud)
- Skien (into Møsvatn, Telemark)
- Tinnåa (into Møsvatn, Telemark)
- Nidelva (in Arendal, Agder)
- Otra (in Kristiansand, Agder)

=== Scotland drainage basin ===
- Tyne (near Dunbar)
- Tay (near Dundee)
- Dee (in Aberdeen)
- Don (in Aberdeen)
- Ythan (in Newburgh, Aberdeenshire)
- Spey (near Elgin)

=== Swedish drainage basin ===
- Göta älv (into Kattegat in Gothenburg)
  - Lake Vänern
    - Klarälven/Trysilelva (into Vänern near Karlstad)
- Viskan (into Kattegat near Varberg)
- Ätran (into Kattegat in Falkenberg)
- Nissan (into Kattegat in Halmstad)
- Lagan (into Kattegat near Laholm)

=== Switzerland drainage basin ===
The Rhine, together with its tributaries the Aare and the Thur drain about two thirds of the water into the North Sea.

== See also ==
- Drainage basin
- European river zonation
- Geography of Europe
- Geography of Germany
- Geography of the North Sea
- Geography of Switzerland
- List of European rivers with alternative names
- Latin names of European rivers
- List of rivers of England
