= Birzenbach =

River in Germany

Location
- Country: Germany
- State: Rhineland-Palatinate

Physical characteristics
- Source
  - location: West of Hardert
- Mouth
  - location: Engelsbach near Rengsdorf
  - coordinates: 50.5003°N 7.5056°E

Basin features
- Progression: Engelsbach→ Aubach→ Wied→ Rhine→ North Sea

Birzenbach is a river of Rhineland-Palatinate, Germany. It springs west of Hardert. It flows southward and discharges at the eastern outskirts of Rengsdorf into the Engelsbach from the right.

== See also ==
- List of rivers of Rhineland-Palatinate
