= Engelsbach =

Engelsbach may refer to:

- Engelsbach (Aubach), a river of Rhineland-Palatinate, Germany, tributary of the Aubach
- Melbbach, also called Engelsbach, a river of North Rhine-Westphalia, Germany, tributary of the Rhine
- Engelsbach, a locality of the municipality Leinatal in Thuringia, Germany
