= Völkerwiesenbach =

River in Germany

- Location of mouth

Location
- Country: Germany
- State: Rhineland-Palatinate

Physical characteristics
- Source
  - location: northeast of Bonefeld
- Mouth
  - location: Engelsbach near Rengsdorf
  - coordinates: 50.5003°N 7.5056°E

Basin features
- Progression: Engelsbach→ Aubach→ Wied→ Rhine→ North Sea

Völkerwiesenbach is a small river of Rhineland-Palatinate, Germany. It springs northeast of Bonefeld. On its course, it traverses the artificial lake of the Obere Mühle in Rengsdorf. It is a right tributary of the Engelsbach at the eastern outskirts of Rengsdorf.

In 1926, in Rengsdorf an outdoor swimming pool was opened using the water of the Völkerwiesenbach, supported by Fritz Henkel, the founder of Henkel. In 1966, it was replaced by a new one, located above the old one.

== See also ==
- List of rivers of Rhineland-Palatinate
