= Lohmann & Rauscher =

German-Austrian manufacturer

Lohmann & Rauscher International
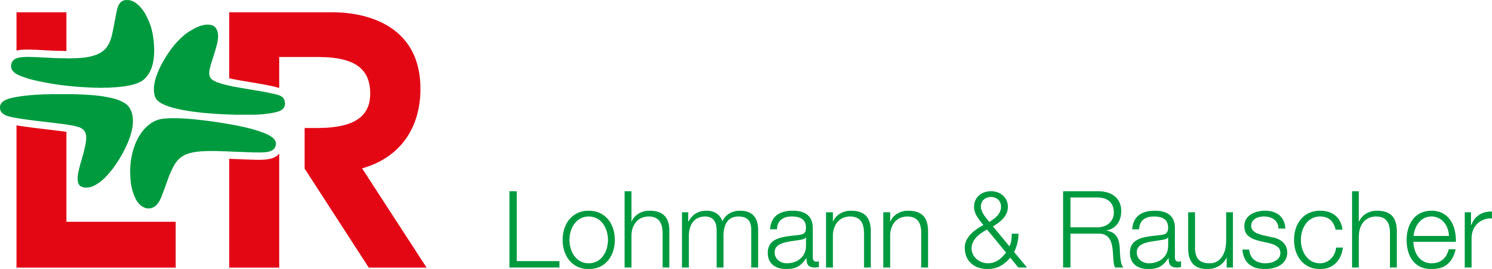
- Company type: GmbH & Co.KG
- Industry: Medical devices
- Founded: 1998
- Headquarters: Rengsdorf (Germany), Vienna (Austria)
- Key people: Thomas Menitz (CEO, COO), Holger Mägdefrau (CFO), Dr. Klemens Schulz (CPO), Fabio Cortesi (CCO)
- Products: Medical, hygiene and nursing products
- Revenue: 793 MEUR (2023)
- Number of employees: > 5,500 (April 2021)
- Website: www.lohmann-rauscher.com

Lohmann & Rauscher (L&R) is a German-Austrian manufacturer of medical devices and hygiene products. The company is a result of a merger in 1998 between Lohmann (established in 1851) and Rauscher (formed in 1899), renamed as Lohmann & Rauscher International GmbH & Co. KG, with headquarters based in both Rengsdorf, Germany and Vienna.

L&R's customers include hospitals, doctors, nurses, pharmacies, medical supplies retailers, wholesalers and industry, and retail businesses for consumer products.

The company has production facilities in Austria, Germany, France, the Czech Republic, and China and over 5,500 employees worldwide. In 2020, the corporate group included 50 subsidiaries, shareholdings in 27 countries, and by more than 130 partner companies. The company headquarters are located in Rengsdorf (Germany) and Vienna (Austria).

== History ==
In 1851 Julius Lüscher registered a "Handlung in Material-Waaren" under the company name Julius Lüscher in Frankfurt am Main, Germany. This registration marked the beginning of the Lohmann business entity. In 1899, Austrian family company, Rauscher, was established in Vienna as a manufacturer and distributor of surgical dressings and supplies for nursing care. The company quickly became the largest manufacturer in the Danube district and a supplier to the royal court.

By 1900, new factory facilities were established in Fahr am Rhein, now part of Neuwied, Germany, employing approximately 60 workers. This factory became the new headquarters of Lohmann. The product range expanded to include zinc paste bandages, dressings, bandages for burns, and sterile wound dressings.

In 1930, Cellona, a ready-to-use pre-formed fixed plaster of Paris bandage, was introduced to the market. The development revolutionised and simplified plaster techniques globally. The company's core markets in Eastern Europe vanished after World War I, and World War II further impacted its operations.

1961 marked the launch of a new compression bandage known as Rosidal. This was later expanded into a product family. Rauscher then relocated to a new headquarters in Vienna, Austria, near Auhof in 1975. This location continues to serve as the company's headquarters to this day. In the early 1970s Helmut Leuprecht joined the Lohmann company and began its expansion internationally - establishing sales offices throughout Europe.

The market launch of OR Set Systems, widely known as “Kitpacks,” were launched to market in 1987, offering preassembled OR sets that standardised and streamlined OR preparation. In 1988 Lohmann inaugurated a former villa in Rengsdorf, Germany, for internal training courses. The site was dubbed 'Lohmann College'.

In 1991, the central administration of Lohmann relocated to Rengsdorf, Germany. This site became one of two locations with headquarter functions, alongside the site in Vienna, Austria.

In 1991, Lohmann acquired Koester GmbH & Co. KG. The company specialised in self-adhesive and mechanical closures for diapers and incontinence pads, and provides skin-compatible hot-melt adhesives and adhesive tape solutions for hygiene, medical, and technical applications.

In 1998, the Austrian family business Rauscher merged with the German medical device manufacturer counterpart Lohmann Medical. This merger created Lohmann & Rauscher International GmbH & Co. KG, (also known as L&R) with headquarters based in both Rengsdorf and Vienna.

In 2013, L&R established a full subsidiary in China. Following market entry through the Chinese joint venture “Topamed,” L&R founded its own company, L&R China, with headquarters in Shanghai and Beijing.

In 2014, it acquired Solaris Inc., specialists in the area of lymphology and compression hosiery.

In 2016 the Lohmann College underwent refurbishment for 2.2 million euros including a slight pivot in user to a conference venue as well as a training facility.

In 2016, the Dutch company Varitex N.V., a specialist in phlebological and lymphological therapy, was acquired by L&R.

In the same year, Flawa Consumer GmbH (Flawa) a 100 percent subsidiary of U.S. Cotton, underwent a merger of their marketing and sales department with L&R. Flawa historically produced cotton products such as cotton wool used in first aid kits. The two companies had maintained a close working relationship for decades. As of January 2017, Nicolas Härtsch, Chief Operating Officer and major shareholder of Flawa, joined the Board of Directors of Lohmann & Rauscher AG.

In 2018, Salzmann AG St. Gallen sold its Swiss compression specialist company Swisslastic AG St. Gallen, along with its majority stakes in Venosan Brasil, Venosan China, and Venosan Canada, to Lohmann & Rauscher.

In 2019, Lohmann & Rauscher (L&R) acquired assets of French business, Medical Textile Ariegeois. In 2020, L&R entered a partnership with Livzon Pharma Enters into Licensing Agreement with Lohmann Therapie-Systeme.

In 2021, Lohmann & Rauscher (L&R) expanded its expertise and product range in customised medical procedure trays by acquiring Angiokard Medizintechnik GmbH, a German company and former portfolio entity of Deutsche Mittelstand Beteiligungen GmbH (DMB). Angiokard Medizintechnik GmbH, established in 1986, specialised in customised trays for medical fields including cardiology, anesthesia, and intensive care.

In April 2024, Lohmann & Rauscher completed extensive modernisation efforts at its production site in Neuwied. The renovation, which lasted twelve months and involved five construction phases, upgraded a 960-square-meter building complex to modern standards and enhanced the environmental sustainability of the facility.

== Gallery ==
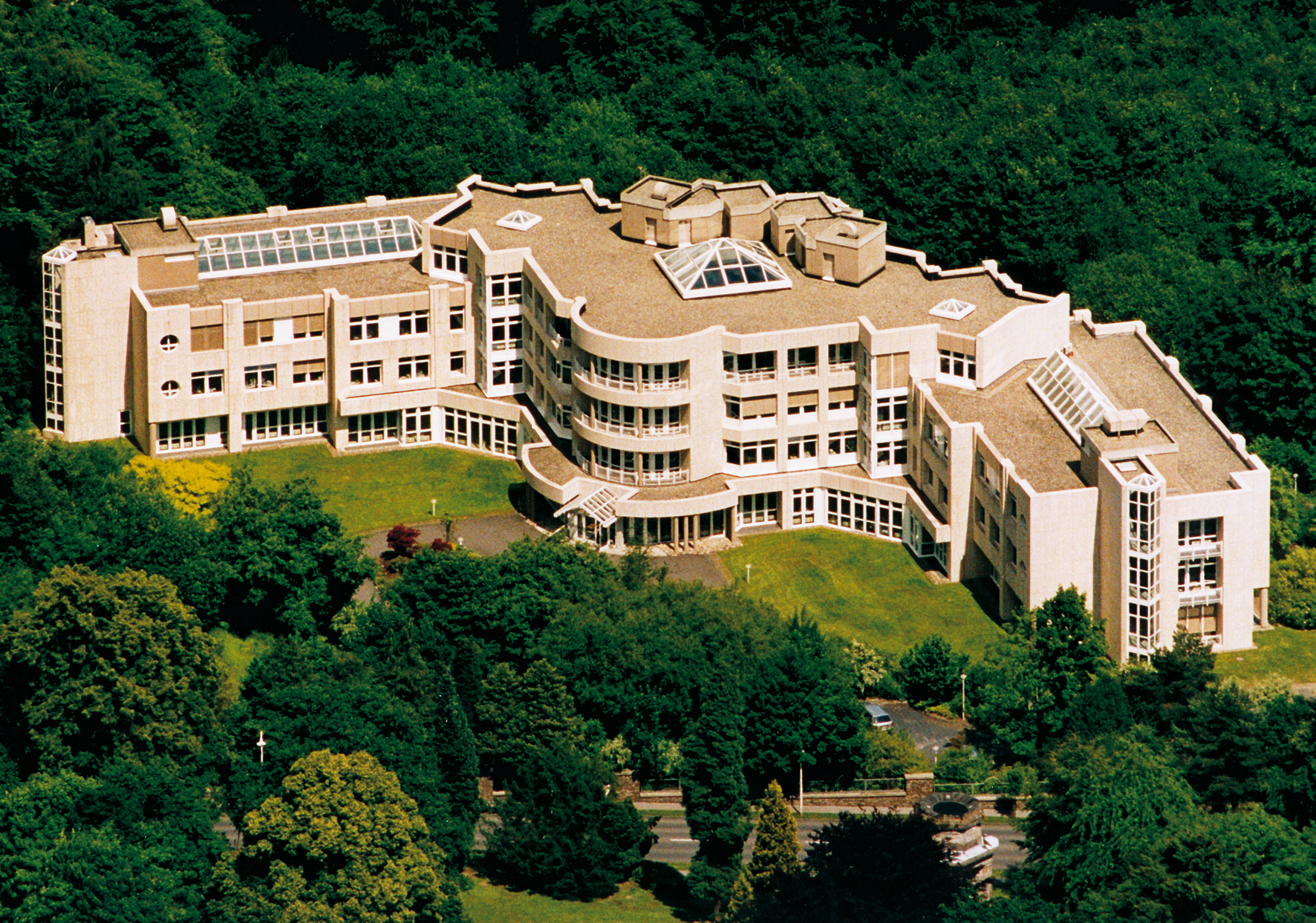
Headquarters Rengsdorf

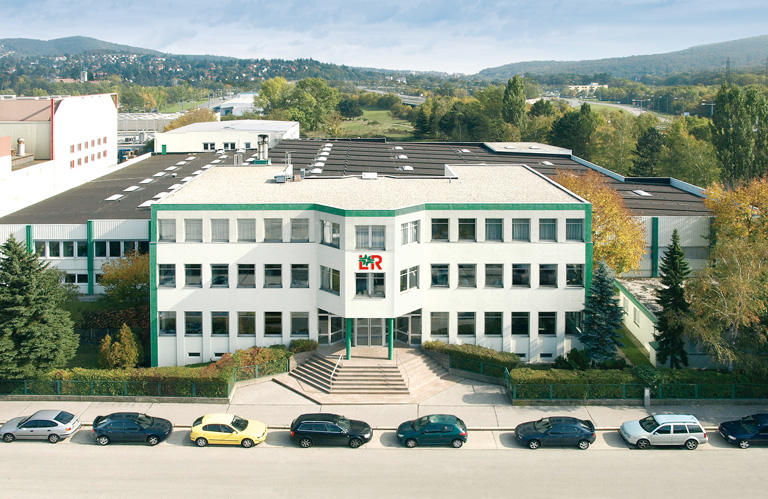
Headquarters Vienna

== Subsidiaries ==
=== Angiokard Medizintechnik ===
Associated with L&R since 2021, Angiokard Medizintechnik, based in Friedeburg, Austria, was a production plant for L&R. The subsidiary manufactured surgical sets for cardiology, Angiokard Kitpacks for cardiac surgery and intensive care settings, angiography and anaesthsia products. The subsidiary closed at the end of 2023. Approximately 100 of the 115 employees were affected by the closure. The company cited the decision was driven by significant cost increases that had made the production of surgical sets (angiocard kitpacks) uncompetitive. The impacts of the COVID-19 pandemic and the Russian invasion of Ukraine had led to substantial price increases in energy, transport, and raw materials, which contributed to the loss of competitiveness and made continued production in the Friedeburg site untenable. Production processes were transferred to L&R's site in Slavkov, Czech Republic.
