= Engelsbach (Aubach) =

River in Germany

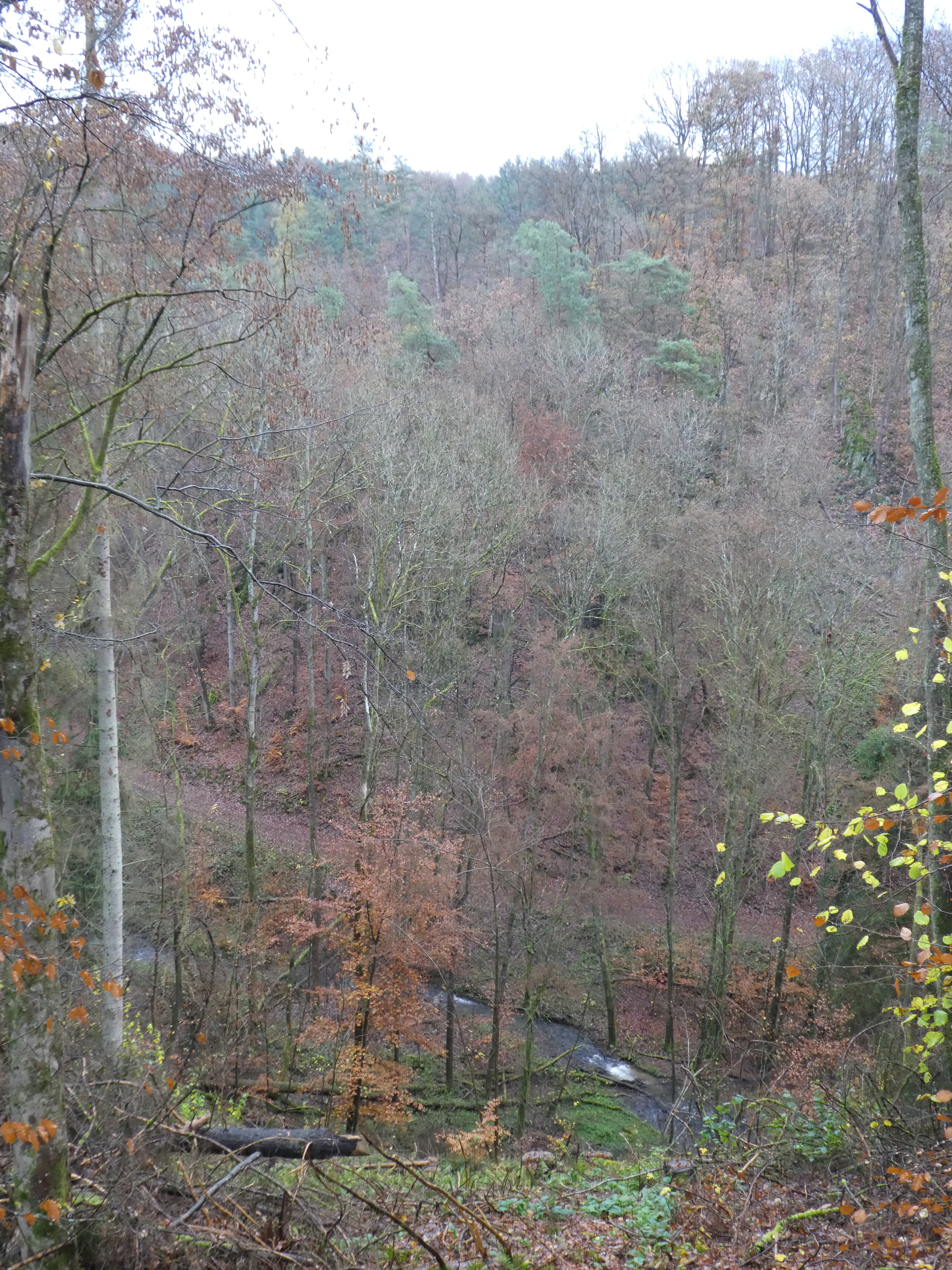
- View from Rengsdorf into the valley of the Engelsbach

- Location of mouth

Location
- Country: Germany
- State: Rhineland-Palatinate

Physical characteristics
- Source
  - location: at the eastern outskirts of Rengsdorf
- Mouth
  - location: near the reservoir Schwanenteich in Neuwied-Oberbieber into the Aubach
  - coordinates: 50.4808°N 7.5143°E

Basin features
- Progression: Aubach→ Wied→ Rhine→ North Sea
- Tributaries
  - right: Völkerwiesenbach; Birzenbach

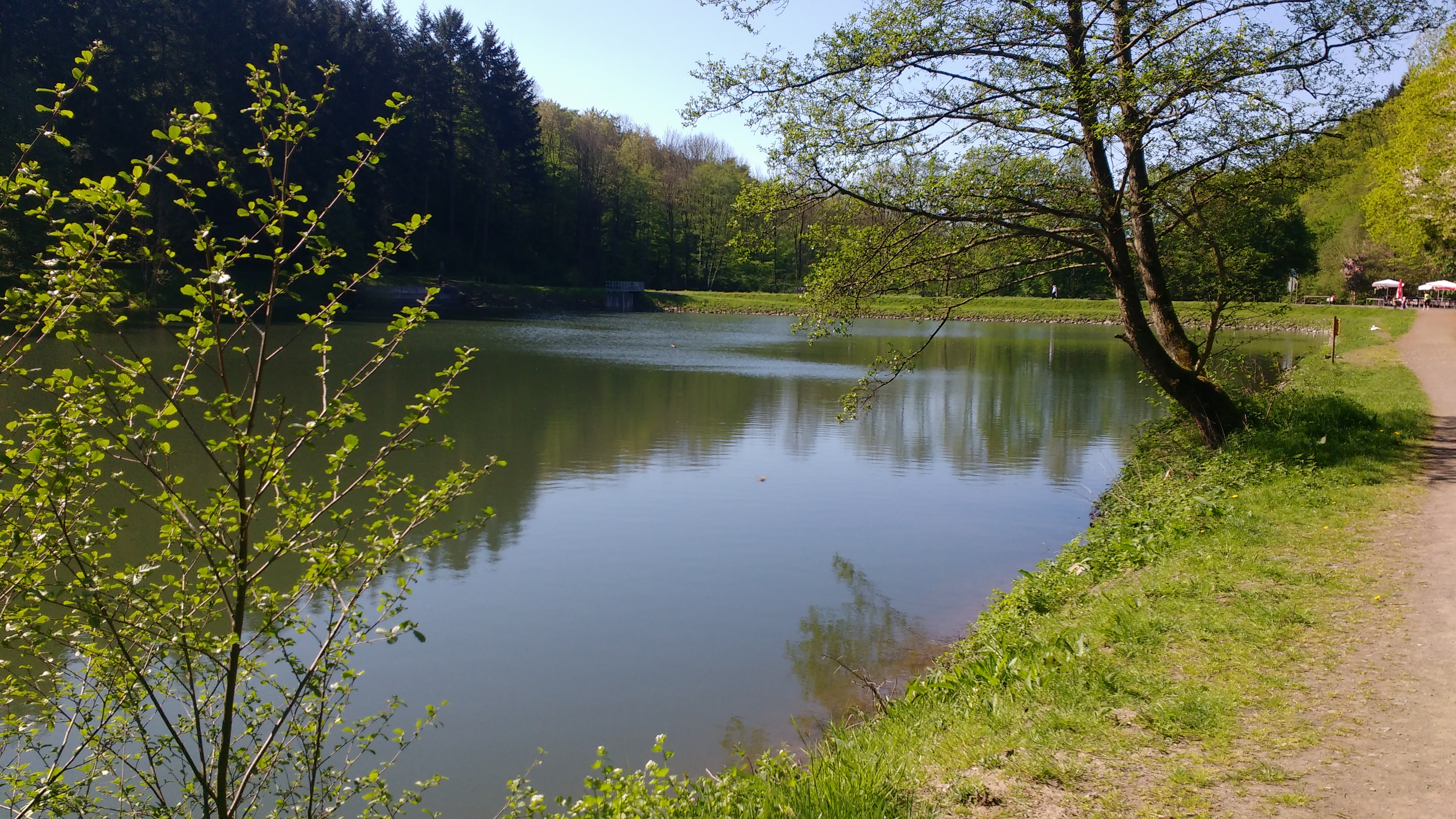
The reservoir Schwanenteich

Engelsbach is a river of Rhineland-Palatinate, Germany. It springs at the eastern outskirts of Rengsdorf. It flows southward through the valley Engelsbachtal. Near the reservoir Schwanenteich at the suburban administrative district Oberbieber of Neuwied, it discharges into the Aubach from the right.

The route through the valley of the Engelsbach is part of the Rheinsteig hiking trail.

== See also ==
- List of rivers of Rhineland-Palatinate
