= Bonefeld =

- Municipality
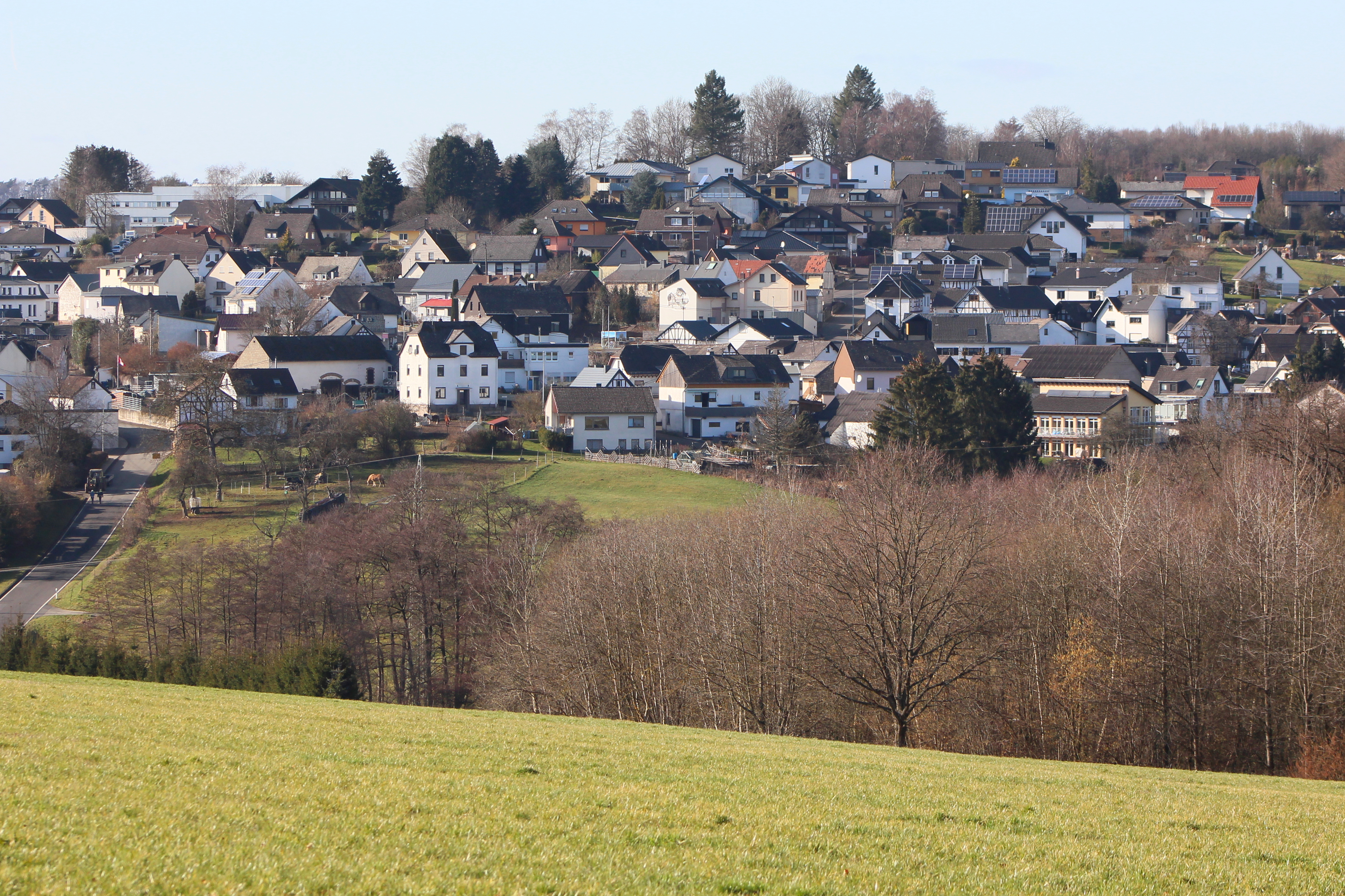

- Coat of arms

- Location of Bonefeld within Neuwied district
- Interactive map of Bonefeld
- Location within Germany Location within Rhineland-Palatinate
- Coordinates: 50°31′26″N 7°29′27″E
- Country: Germany
- State: Rhineland-Palatinate
- District: Neuwied
- Municipal assoc.: Rengsdorf-Waldbreitbach

Government
  - Mayor (2019–24): Claudia Runkel

Area
  - Total: 5.2 km^{2} (2.0 sq mi)
- Elevation: 345 m (1,132 ft)

Population (2025-12-31)
  - Total: 938
  - Density: 180/km^{2} (470/sq mi)
- Time zone: UTC+01:00 (CET)
  - Summer (DST): UTC+02:00 (CEST)
- Postal codes: 56579
- Dialling codes: 02634
- Vehicle registration: NR
- Website: www.bonefeld.de

Bonefeld (German pronunciation: [ˈboːnəfɛlt]) is a municipality in the district of Neuwied, in Rhineland-Palatinate, Germany.

To the south and east, the settlement of Bonefeld slopes down into the valley of the river Völkerwiesenbach, which springs north of the village.
