= Melbbach =

River in Germany

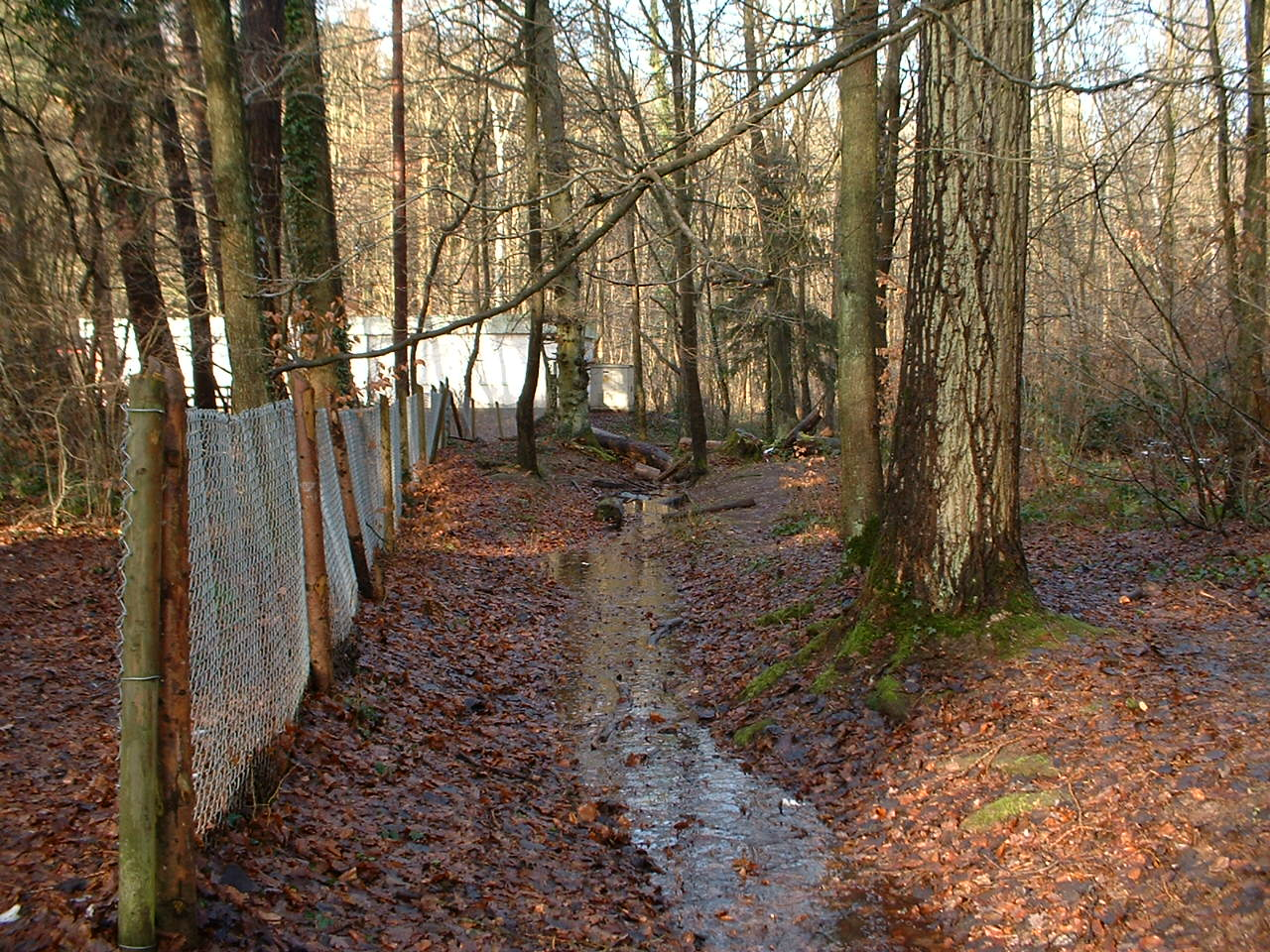

Location
- Country: Germany
- State: North Rhine-Westphalia

Physical characteristics
- Mouth
  - location: Rhine
  - coordinates: 50.7290°N 7.1116°E
- Length: 6.1 km (3.8 mi)

Basin features
- Progression: Rhine→ North Sea

Melbbach (also: Engelbach or Engelsbach) is a small river of North Rhine-Westphalia, Germany. It flows into the Rhine in Bonn.

== See also ==
- List of rivers of North Rhine-Westphalia
