= Long Eau =

River in Lincolnshire, England

Coordinates: 53°22′54″N 0°11′46″E

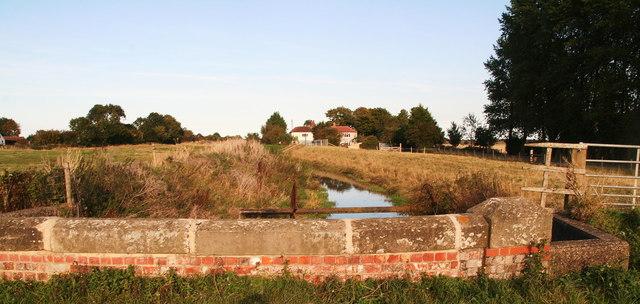
Long Eau at Carlton Grange

The Long Eau is a river in Lincolnshire, England, rising from the Chalk Streams of the Lincolnshire Wolds and joining its companion stream, the Great Eau south of Saltfleetby All Saints.

The Long Eau drains a small catchment of 22.3 km2.

The placename element Eau for a river is common in Lincolnshire and comes not from the French, but from Old English Ea - a river, related to modern Germanic Aa.
