= Great Eau =

River in Lincolnshire, England

Coordinates: 53°25′N 0°13′E

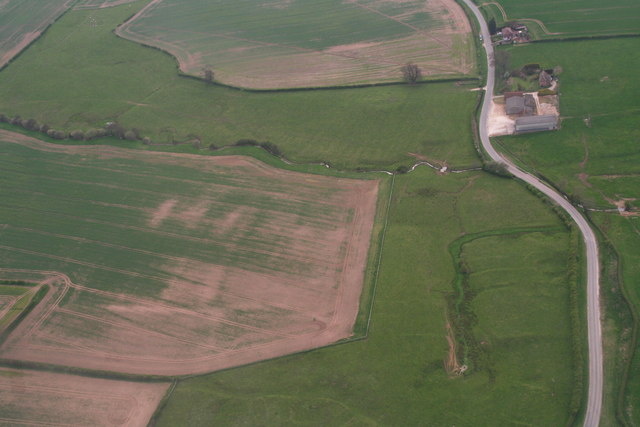
Calceby brook and spring, the source of the Great Eau

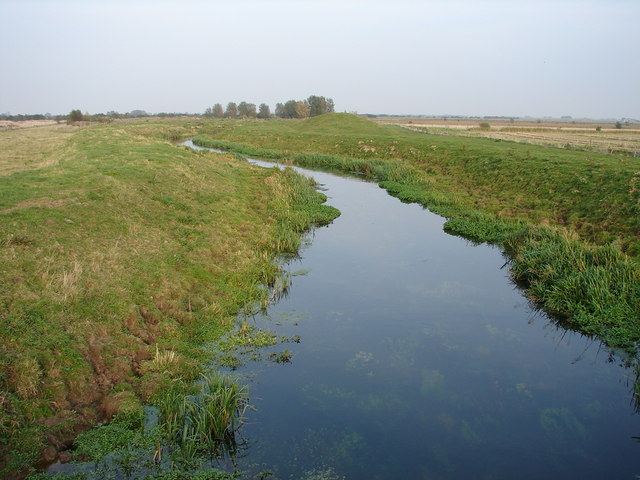
The Great Eau at Barfen Farm near to Gayton le Marsh

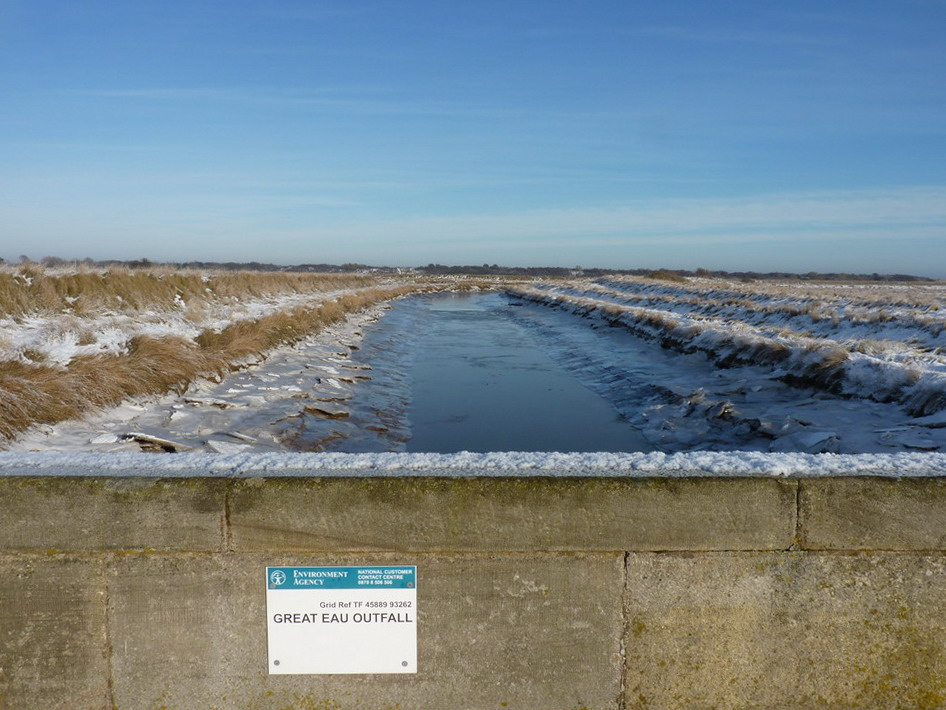
Tidal outflow of the Great Eau

The Great Eau is a river in Lincolnshire, England, rising from the Chalk Streams of the Lincolnshire Wolds and running to Saltfleet Haven on the coast. It is joined by its companion stream, the Long Eau.

The placename element Eau for a river is common in Lincolnshire and comes not from the French, but from Old English Ea – a river, related to modern Germanic Aa.
