= Rengsdorf =

- Municipality
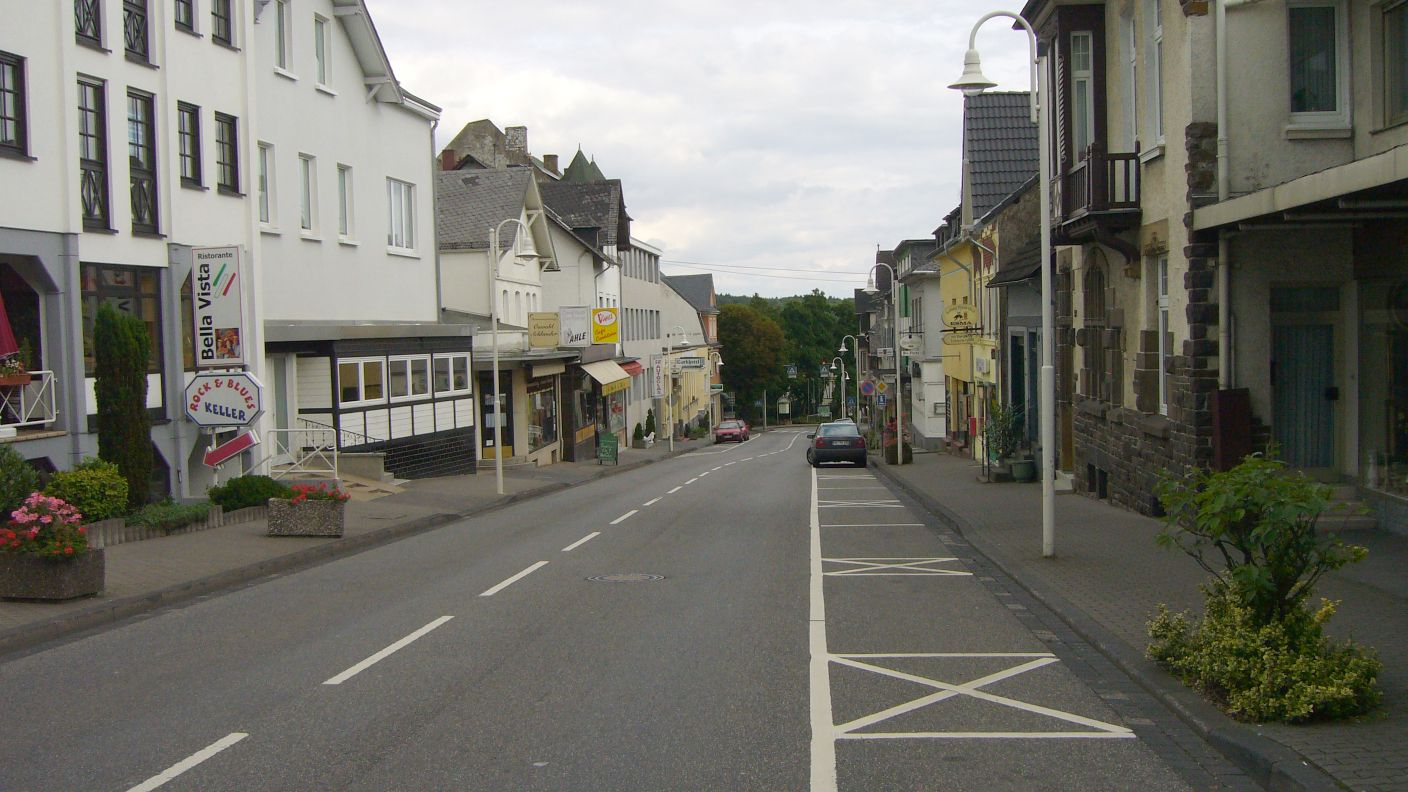
- The main street (Hauptstraße) in Rengsdorf

- Coat of arms

- Location of Rengsdorf within Neuwied district
- Interactive map of Rengsdorf
- Location within Germany Location within Rhineland-Palatinate
- Coordinates: 50°30′08″N 7°29′50″E
- Country: Germany
- State: Rhineland-Palatinate
- District: Neuwied
- Municipal assoc.: Rengsdorf-Waldbreitbach

Government
  - Mayor: Marc Dillenberger

Area
  - Total: 6.91 km^{2} (2.67 sq mi)
- Elevation: 240 m (790 ft)

Population (2025-12-31)
  - Total: 2,996
  - Density: 434/km^{2} (1,120/sq mi)
- Time zone: UTC+01:00 (CET)
  - Summer (DST): UTC+02:00 (CEST)
- Postal codes: 56579
- Dialling codes: 02634
- Vehicle registration: NR
- Website: www.kurortrengsdorf.de

Rengsdorf (German pronunciation: [ˈʁɛŋsdɔʁf]) is a municipality in the district of Neuwied, in Rhineland-Palatinate, Germany. It is situated in the Westerwald, approx. 10 km north of Neuwied.

Rengsdorf is the seat of the Verbandsgemeinde ("collective municipality") Rengsdorf-Waldbreitbach.

Today Rengsdorf is a regional well known Heilklimatischer Kurort ("air spa") with popular forest walks. The Rheinsteig, a 320 km (200 mi) hiking trail, also passes by the village.

In 1926, an outdoor swimming pool was opened using the water of the small river Völkerwiesenbach, supported by Fritz Henkel, the founder of Henkel. In 1966, it was replaced by a new one, located above the old one.

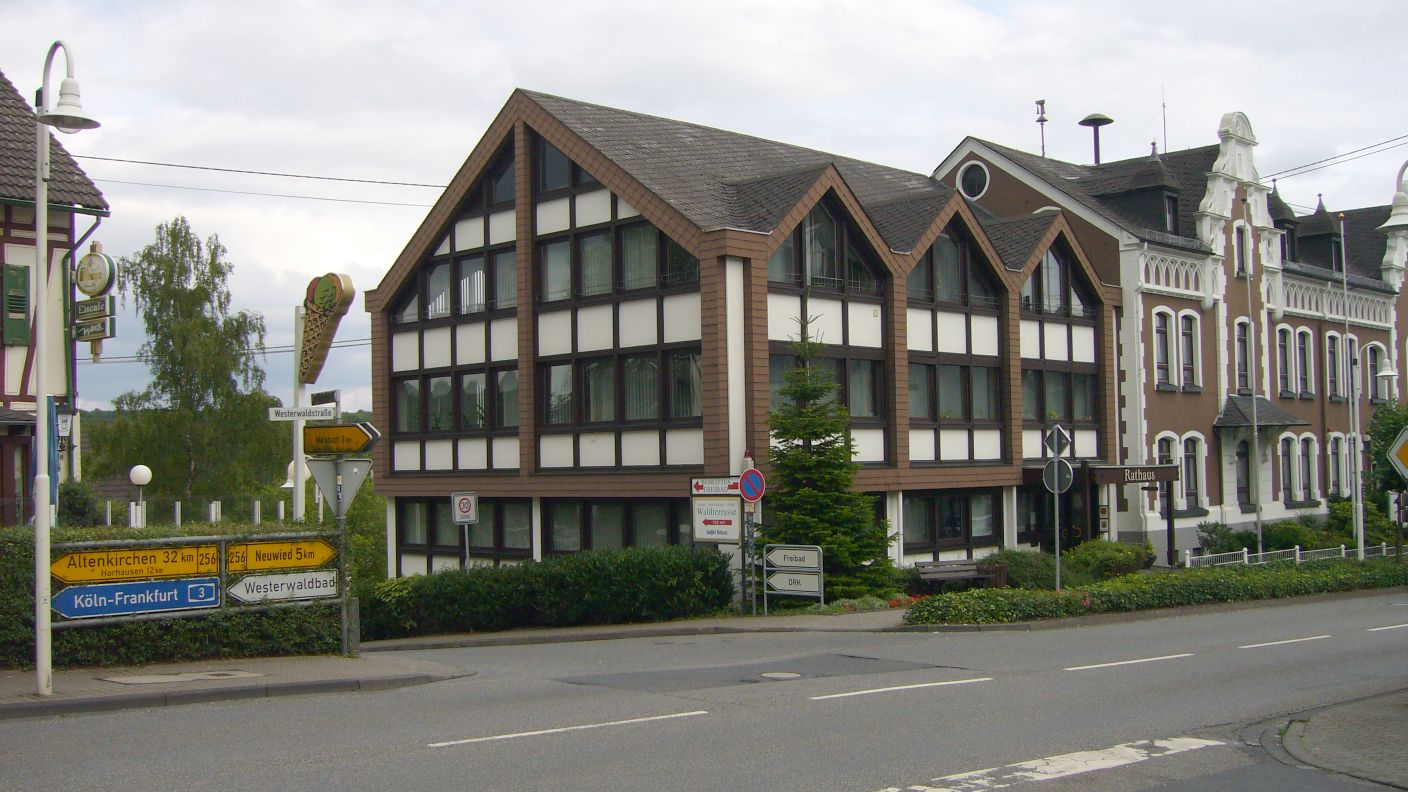
Town hall and seat of the Verbandsgemeinde

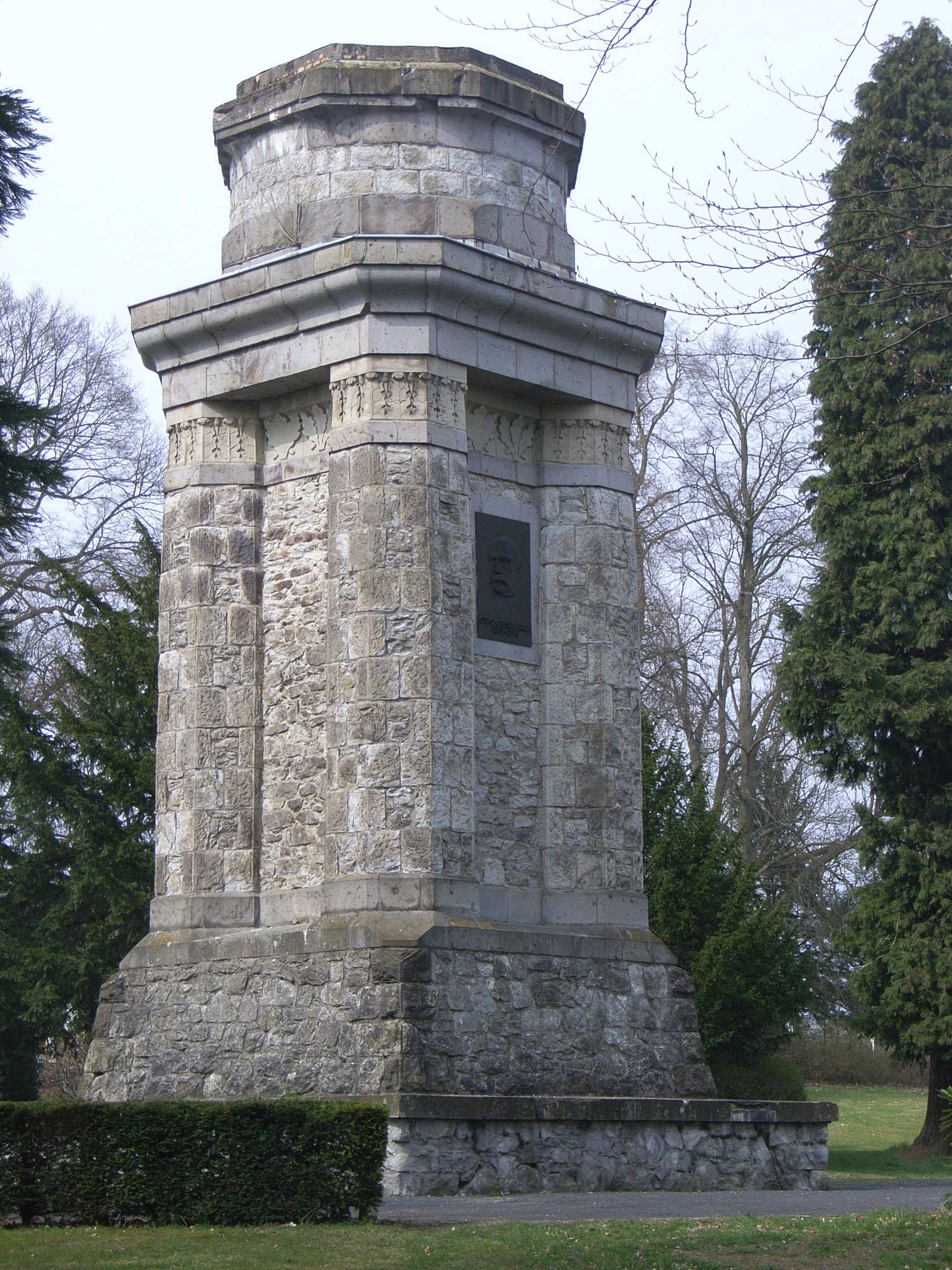
The Bismarcksäule in Rengsdorf, a Bismarck tower, inaugurated in 1903

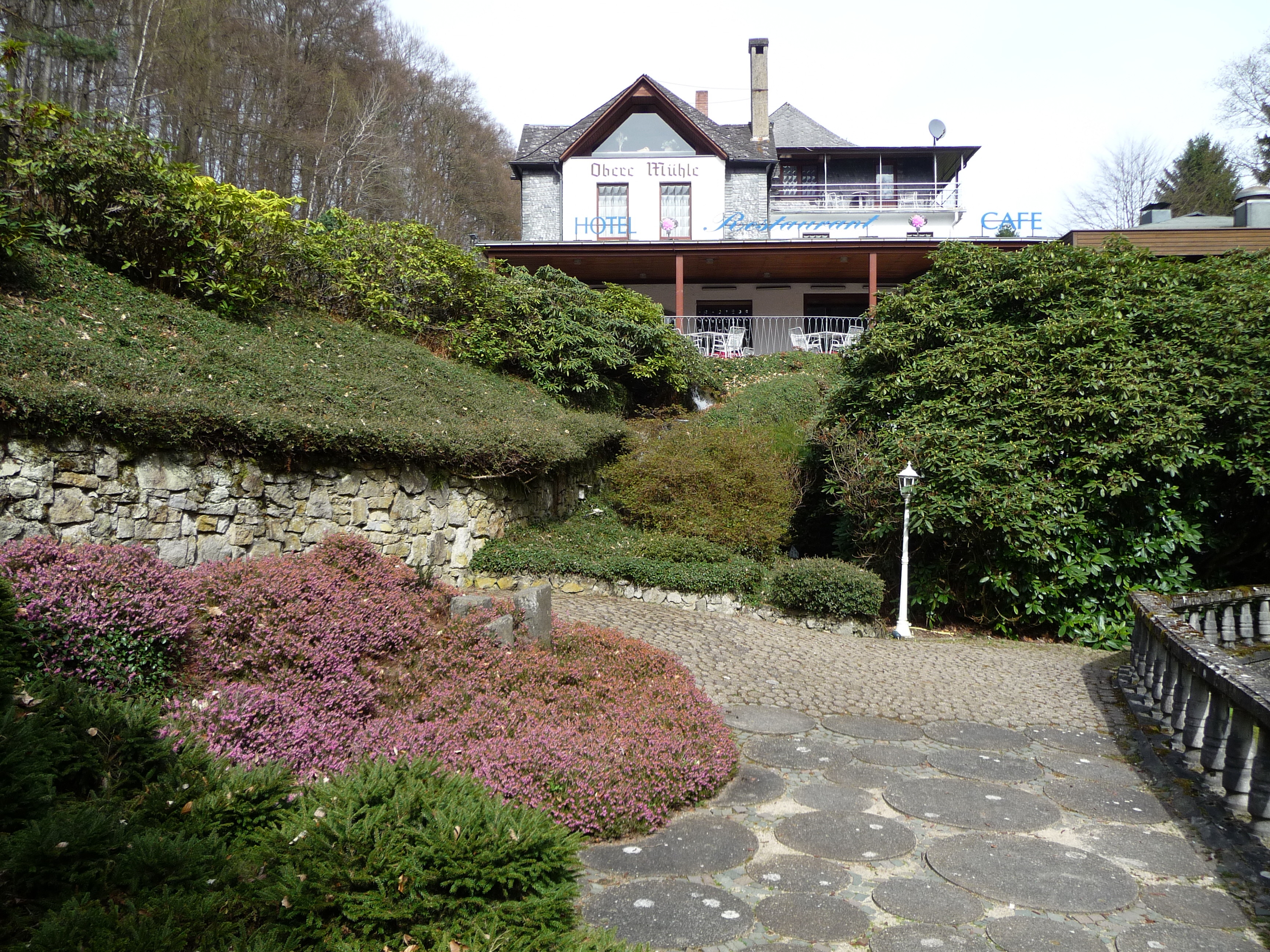
Park of the Obere Mühle in 2014

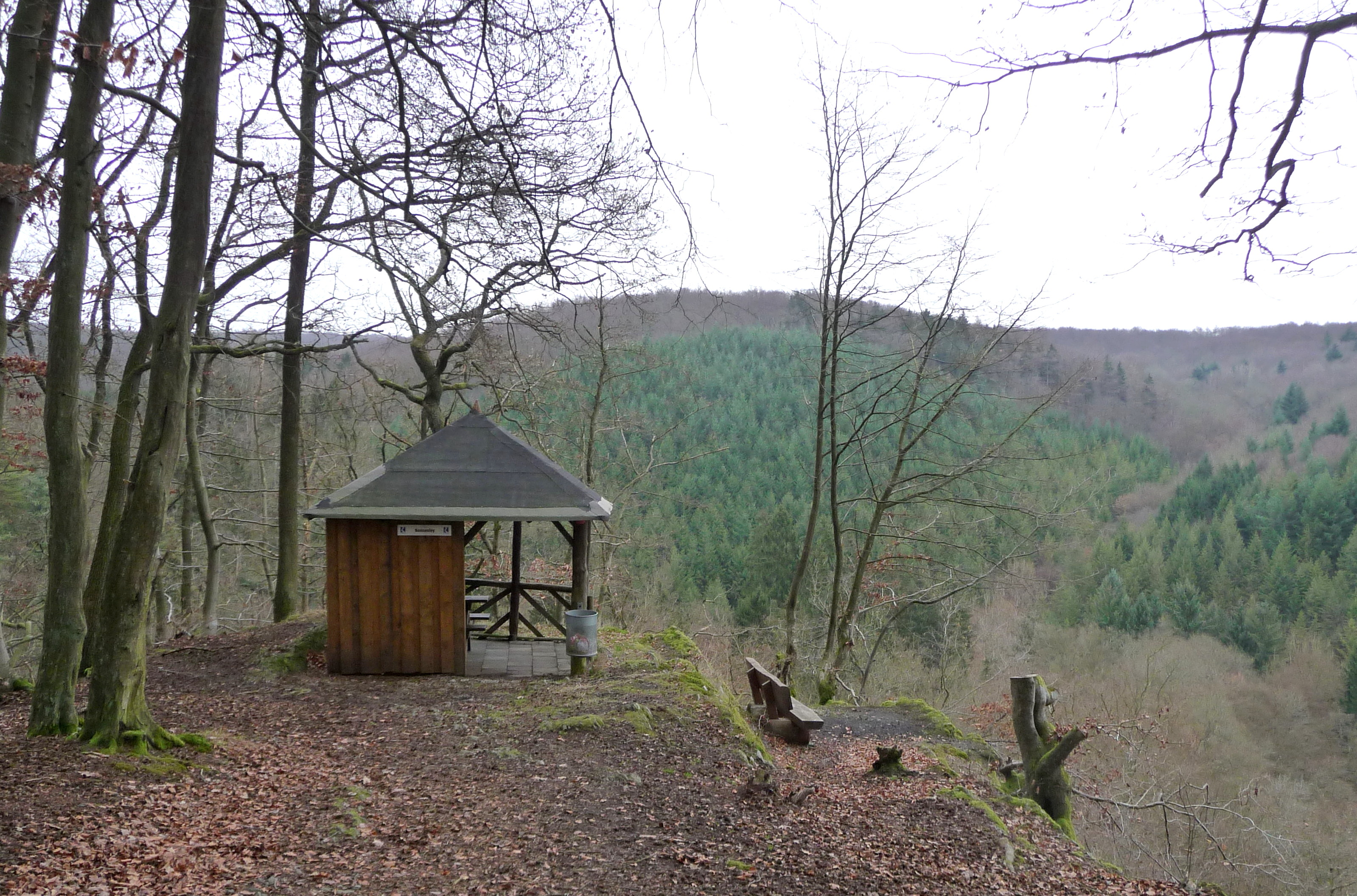
The wooden shelter Nonnenley on the Ley of the same name

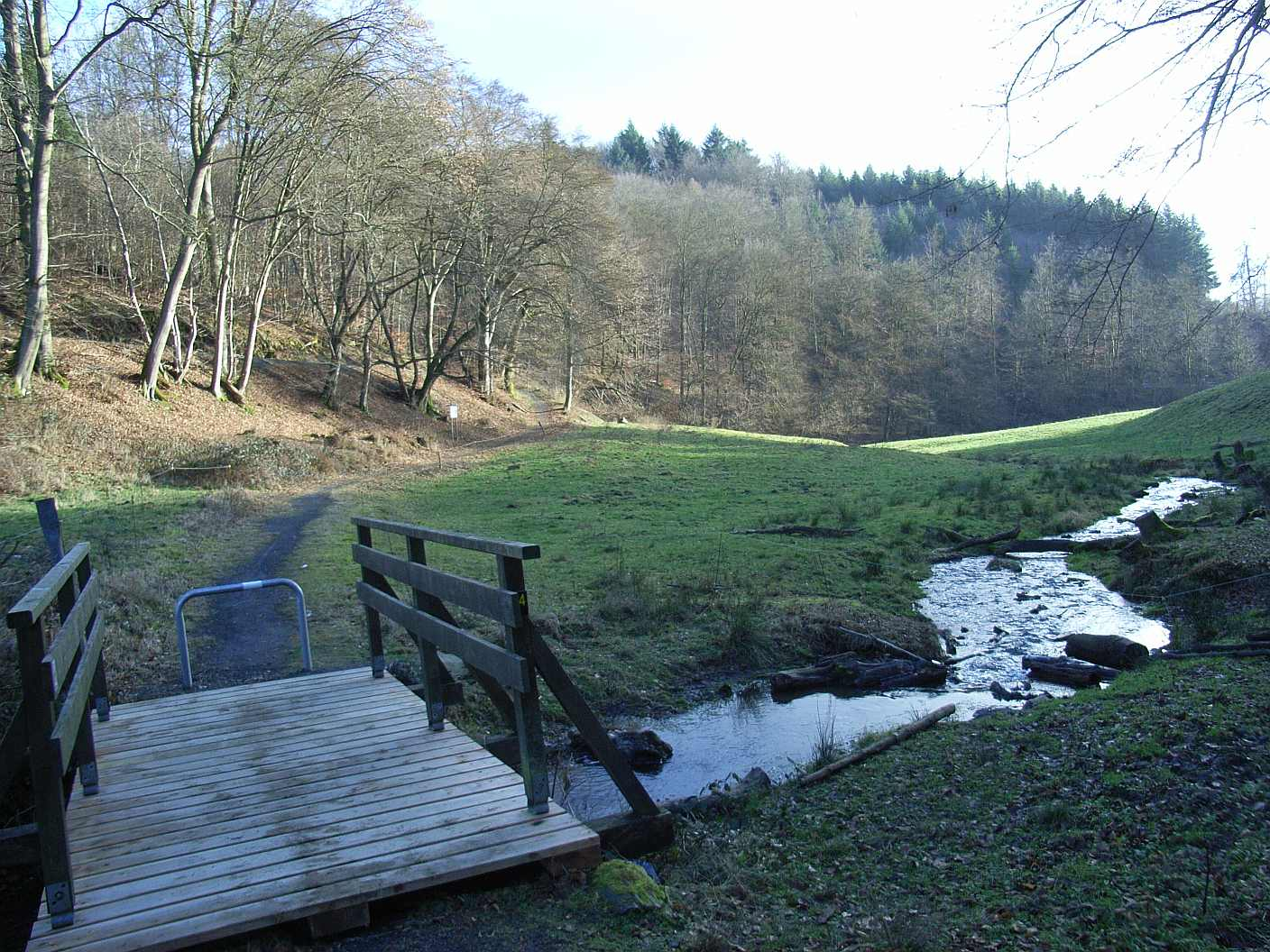
The brook Laubach between Ehlscheid and Rengsdorf

== Economy ==
Lohmann & Rauscher, a developer, producer, and seller of medical devices and hygiene products has one of its headquarters in Rengsdorf (the other one in Vienna, Austria). The headquarter of Berge & Meer, a travel operator, is located in Rengsdorf as well as the one of Winkler und Dünnebier Süßwarenmaschinen, a confectionery machinery manufacturer. Since 1997, Winkler und Dünnebier Süßwarenmaschinen GmbH belongs to the Maschinenbau Runkel GmbH, a mechanical engineering company that is also seated in Rengsdorf. Other companies with their seat in Rengsdorf are meta Trennwandanlagen GmbH & Co. KG, a manufacturer for cubicle systems, personal and storage lockers and changing rooms and the monte mare Betriebs GmbH, a bath operator.

== Notable people ==
- Fritz Henkel (1848–1930), founder of the Henkel Group
- Norbert van Heyst (b. 1944), senior commander in the German Army and commander of the ISAF
