= Aubach (Wied) =

River in Germany

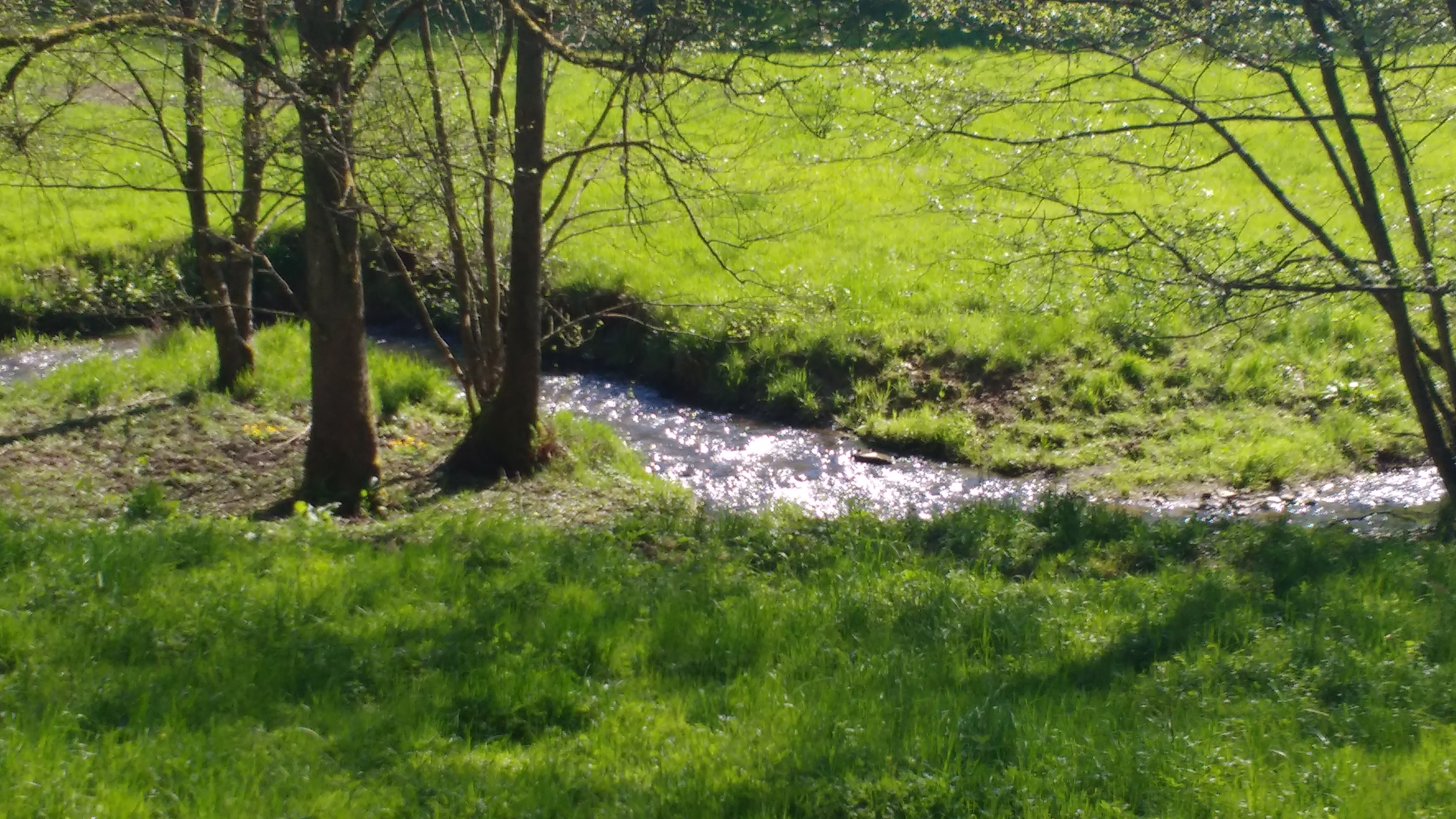

Location
- Country: Germany
- State: Rhineland-Palatinate

Physical characteristics
- Source
  - location: southeast of the waste management plant Linkenbach
- Mouth
  - location: Wied in borough Niederbieber of Neuwied
  - coordinates: 50.4608°N 7.4690°E
- Length: 15.2 km (9.4 mi)

Basin features
- Progression: Wied→ Rhine→ North Sea

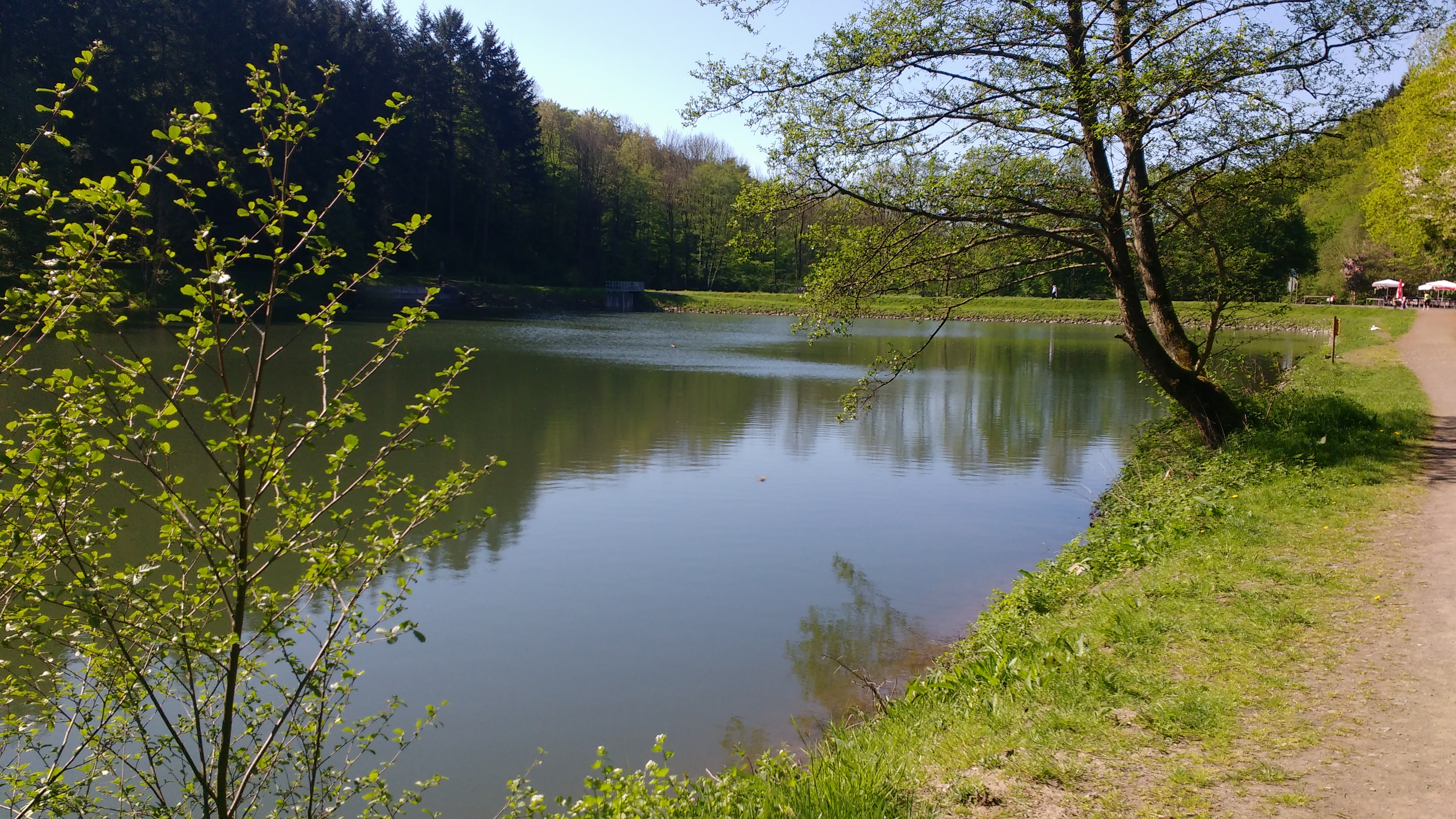
The reservoir Schwanenteich

Aubach is a river of Rhineland-Palatinate, Germany. It springs southeast of the waste management plant Linkenbach. On its course, it traverses the reservoir Schwanenteich near in borough Oberbieber of Neuwied. It is a left tributary of the Wied in the borough Niederbieber of Neuwied.

In Oberbieber, two bridges lead across the Aubach which are both protected monuments.

== See also ==
- List of rivers of Rhineland-Palatinate
