= Rengsdorf (Verbandsgemeinde) =

Municipality in Rhineland-Palatinate, Germany

Coordinates: 50°30′10″N 7°29′38″E

Rengsdorf is a former Verbandsgemeinde ("collective municipality") in the district of Neuwied, in Rhineland-Palatinate, Germany. In January 2018, it was merged into the new Verbandsgemeinde Rengsdorf-Waldbreitbach. The seat of the Verbandsgemeinde was in Rengsdorf.

== Municipalities ==
The Verbandsgemeinde Rengsdorf consisted of the following Ortsgemeinden ("local municipalities"):

1. Anhausen
2. Bonefeld
3. Ehlscheid
4. Hardert
5. Hümmerich
6. Kurtscheid
7. Meinborn
8. Melsbach
9. Oberhonnefeld-Gierend
10. Oberraden
11. Rengsdorf
12. Rüscheid
13. Straßenhaus
14. Thalhausen
