= Waldbreitbach (Verbandsgemeinde) =

Coordinates: 50°33′01″N 7°24′59″E

Waldbreitbach is a former Verbandsgemeinde ("collective municipality") in the district of Neuwied, in Rhineland-Palatinate, Germany. In January 2018 it was merged into the new Verbandsgemeinde Rengsdorf-Waldbreitbach. The seat of the Verbandsgemeinde was in Waldbreitbach.

The Verbandsgemeinde Waldbreitbach consisted of the following Ortsgemeinden ("local municipalities"):

1. Breitscheid
2. Datzeroth
3. Hausen (Wied)
4. Niederbreitbach
5. Roßbach
6. Waldbreitbach
