= Wied (river) =

River in Germany

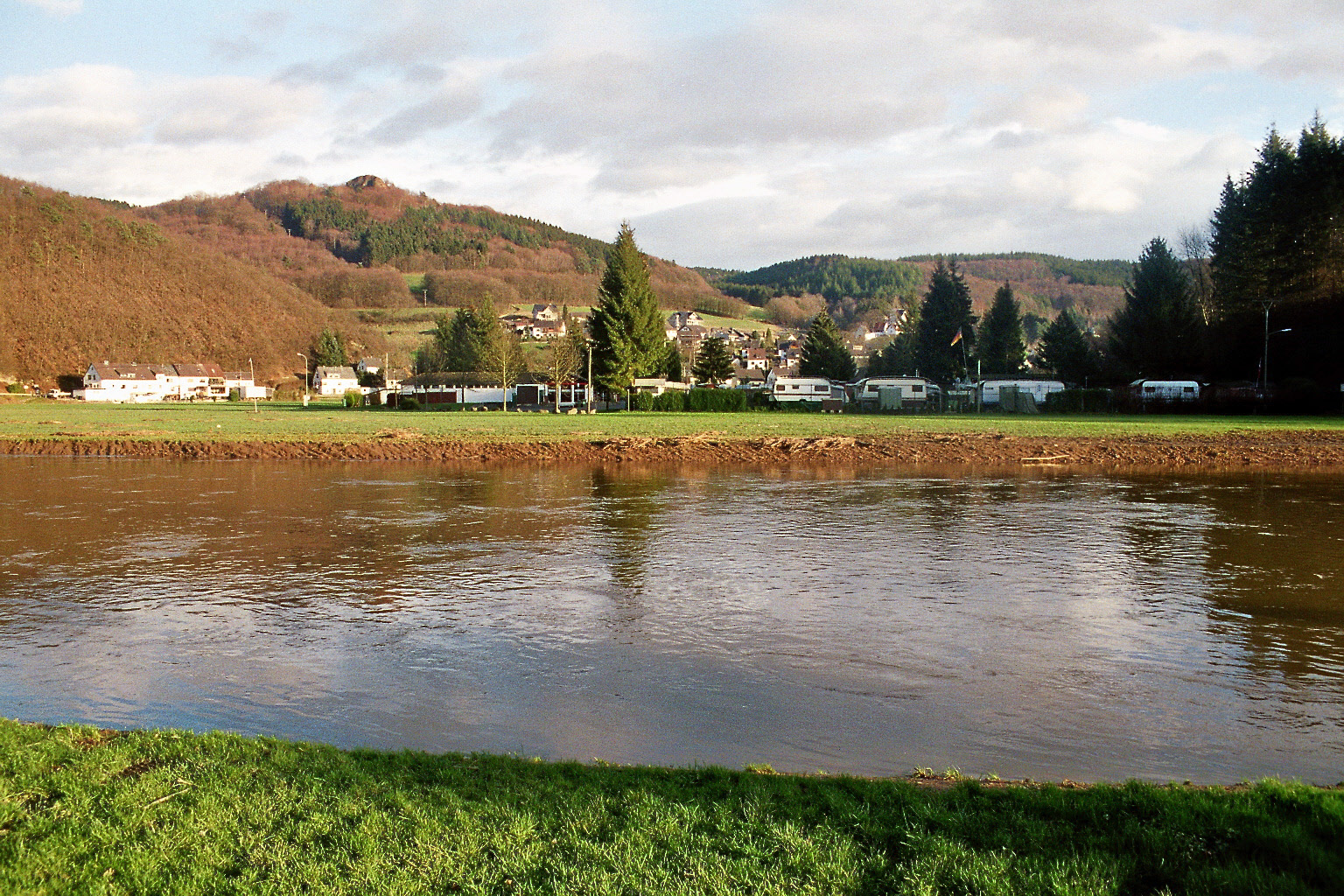
- The Wied at Roßbach

Location
- Country: Germany
- State: Rhineland-Palatinate

Physical characteristics
- Source: Westerwald
  - elevation: 454 m (1,490 ft)
- Mouth
  - location: Rhine
  - coordinates: 50°26′29″N 7°26′33″E
- Length: 102.8 km (63.9 mi)
- Basin size: 770 km^{2} (300 sq mi)

Basin features
- Progression: Rhine→ North Sea

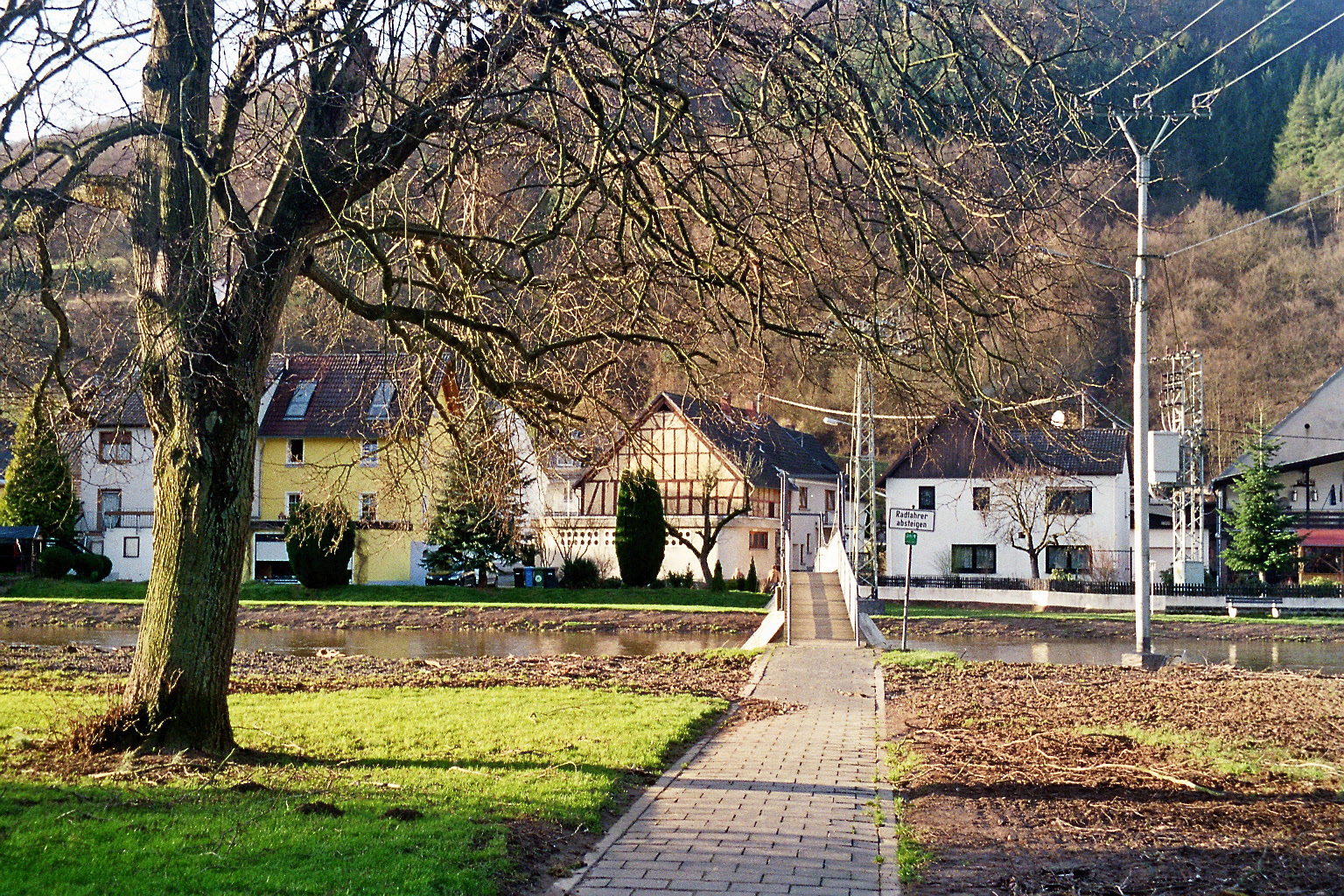
Wied at Roßbach

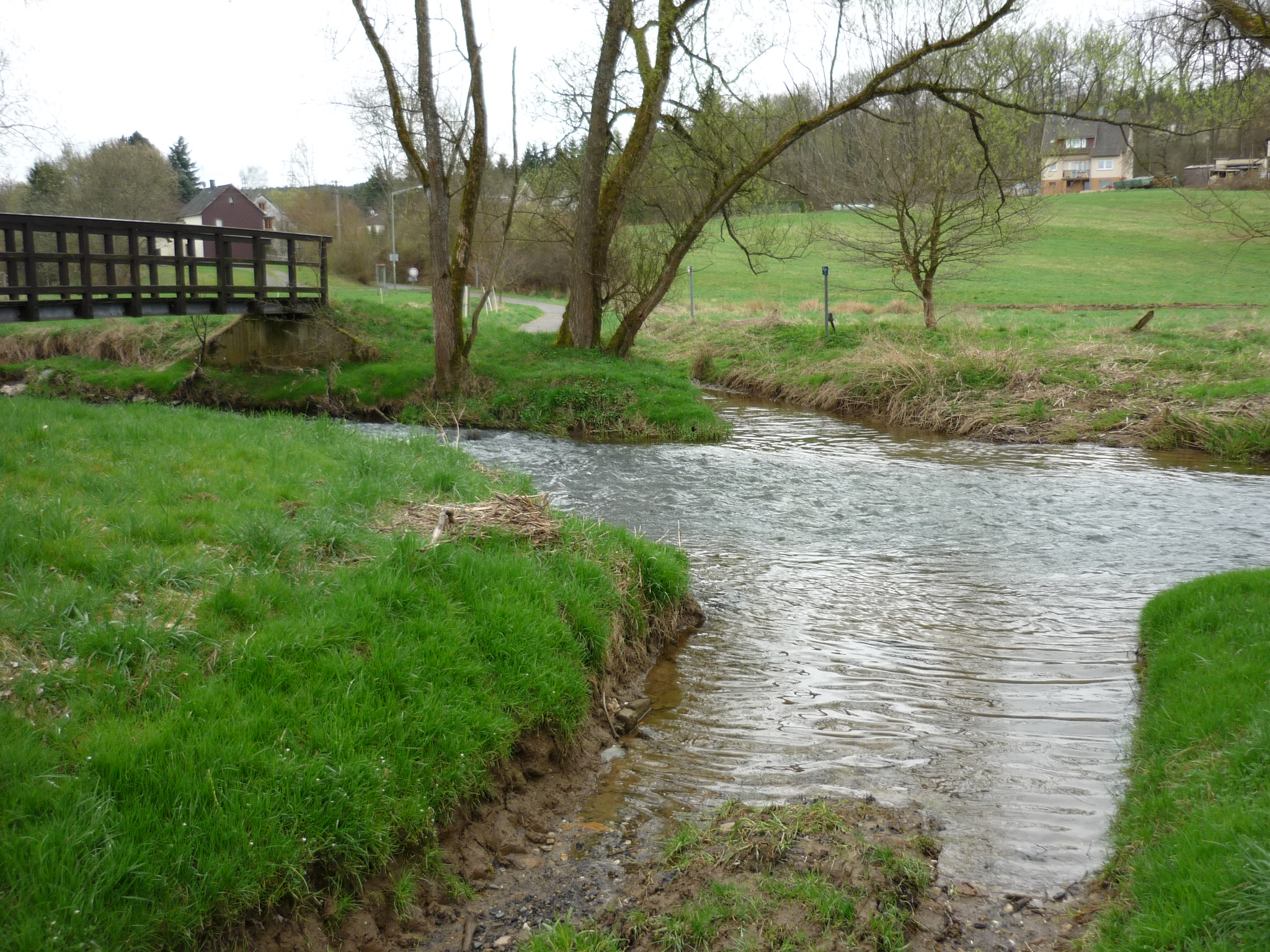
Wiedbridge and Furt in Michelbach

The Wied (German pronunciation: [viːt]) is a river in Rhineland-Palatinate, Germany, and a right tributary of the Rhine.

The Wied is 103 km (64 mi) long. It flows mainly south-west, through the Westerwald hills. Its source is near Dreifelden. It flows through Altenkirchen, Neustadt (Wied) and Waldbreitbach, and ends in the Rhine in Neuwied.

== Tributaries ==
Among the tributaries of the Wied are the following:

Left of the Wied

- Holzbach, near Döttesfeld
- Almersbach, near Almersbach
- Breibach, near Seelbach
- Fockenbach, in Niederbreitbach
- Aubach, in Niederbieber
- Laubach, near Melsbach

Right of the Wied

- Rothenbach, near Hanwerth
- Ingelbach, near Ingelbach
- Michelbach, in Michelbach
- Sehrtenbach, in Altenkirchen
- Erbach (Quengelsbach), in Altenkirchen
- Ölferbach (Lenzbach), near Niederölfen
- Birnbach, near Neitersen
- Mehrbach, near Ehrenstein Abbey (Asbach)
- Pfaffenbach (Hammerbach), near Wiedmühle (Neustadt)
- Reichelbach, near Segendorf (Neuwied)

== See also ==
- List of rivers of Rhineland-Palatinate
