= Laubach (disambiguation) =

Laubach may refer to:

- Laubach, a town in Hesse, Germany
- Laubach, Cochem-Zell, a municipality in the district Cochem-Zell, Rhineland-Palatinate, Germany
- Laubach, Rhein-Hunsrück, a municipality in the district Rhein-Hunsrück, Rhineland-Palatinate, Germany
- Laubach, Bas-Rhin, a commune in the department Bas-Rhin, France
- Laubach (Wied), a river of Rhineland-Palatinate, Germany, tributary of the Wied
- Laubach (Wetter), a river of Hesse, Germany, tributary of the Wetter

== See also ==
- Laubach (surname)
- Solms-Laubach, a former County of southern Hesse and eastern Rhineland-Palatinate, Germany
- Frederick Magnus I, Count of Solms-Laubach (1521–1561), regent of Solms-Laubach and later ruling Count of Solms-Laubach
- Agnes of Solms-Laubach (1546–1602), Countess of Solms-Laubach and Landgravine of Hesse-Kassel
- Sophie of Solms-Laubach (1594–1651), German regent, Margravine of Brandenburg-Ansbach
- Hermann zu Solms-Laubach (1842–1915), German botanist
