= Mechthild of Sayn =

Countess Mechthild of Sayn (c. 1203 – c. 1291), also called Mechthild of Landsberg, Mechtild, Mechtildis or Mathilde, was the wife of Henry III of Sayn. She was an important figure in the Late Middle Ages because of her religious foundations (Stiftungen).

== Life ==
Mechthild was the daughter of Margrave Dietrich of Landsberg, son of Dedi the Fat, and Jutta, daughter and heiress of the Thuringian landgrave, Louis III Mechthild was born around 1200, according to other sources around 1203, and around 1215 she married Count Henry III of Sayn. In a deed at Heisterbach Abbey dating to 1216, Mechthild is described as Henry's wife. The trigger for the marriage was a dispute between Dietrich of Landsberg and Henry II of Sayn, whose territories bordered one another. In addition the two were on opposing sides in the German throne dispute at the end of the 12th century. Dietrich, a supporter of the House of Hohenstaufen, owned Altenwied Castle, built by his ancestors; Henry II was for the House of Welf, and built the Löwenburg. In 1205, Pope Innocent III asked whether the dispute could be settled by a marriage between Henry III and Mechthild. The agreement must have taken place no later than 1207, since Dietrich of Landsberg died that year.

When Henry III of Sayn died on New Year's Eve in 1246, he left no heirs. The only daughter of Mechthild was probably born shortly before or shortly after Henry's death and died soon afterwards.

Henry had had his will drawn up at Blankenheim Castle in the presence of the abbots of Marienstatt and Heisterbach during Christmas week of 1246. He decreed that if his unborn child survived, Mechthild should become the sole heir. But if the child died, then Mechthild should have the right to keep all goods until her death, after her death the estate was to pass to the children of Henry's sisters. Henry's sisters were Adelheid, who first married Godfrey of Sponheim-Starkenburg (died 1223?), her second marriage in 1225 was to Eberhard of Eberstein (died 1263?), and the younger Agnes, who married Henry of Blieskastel.

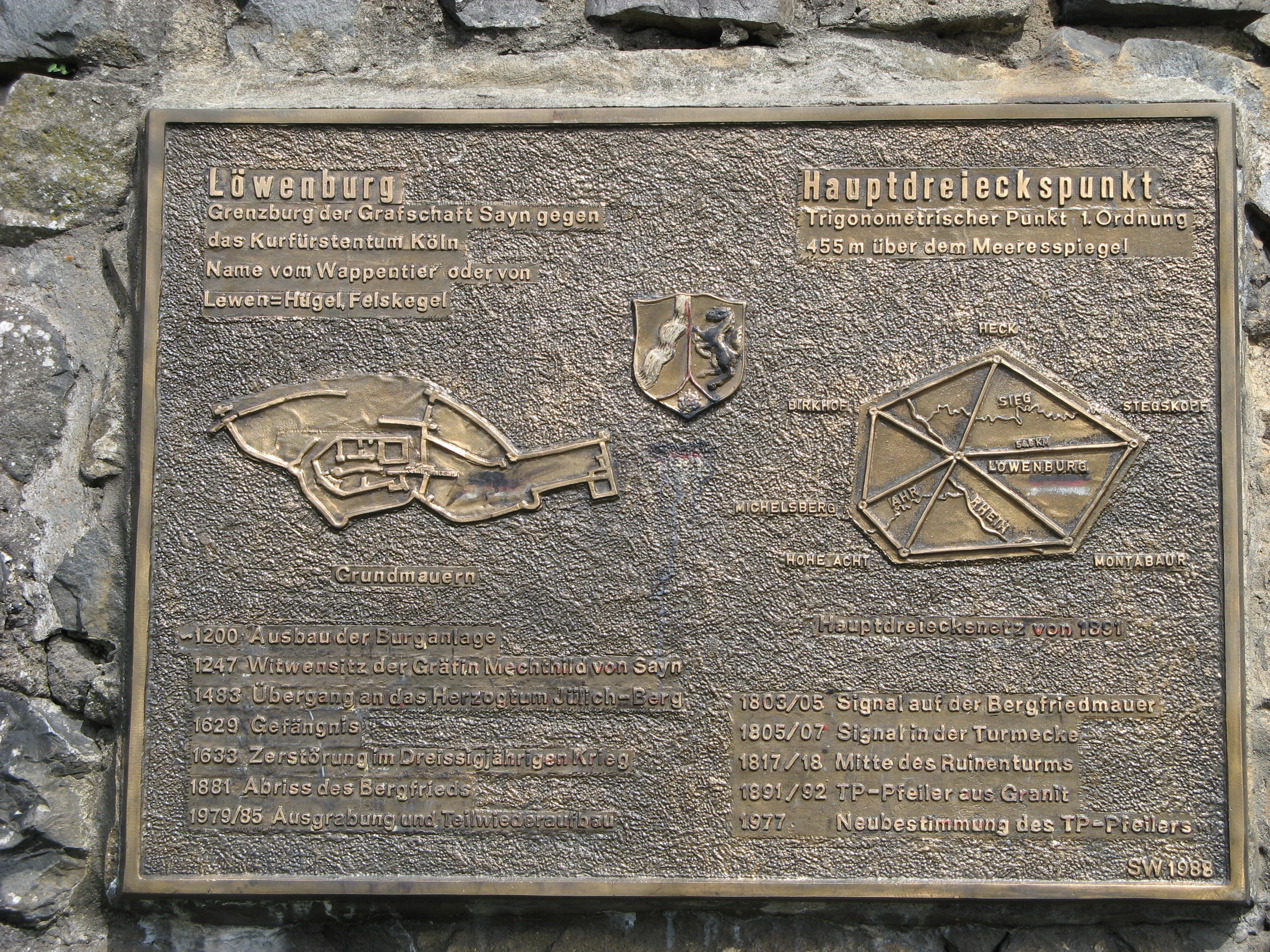
Information board at the Mechthild's dower house at the Löwenburg

Contrary to Henry's wishes, the Sayn family made claims to the Sayn estate shortly after his death and by 29 August 1247, Mechthild left to the sons of her sister-in-law, Adelheid and the others, the castle and town of Blankenberg, the castle and lands of Hachenburg, Freusburg Castle, Sayn Castle, the castles of Saffenburg and Hülchrath and all the counties and bailiwicks that Henry had owned. Mechthild retained her own Thuringian inheritance and reserved the right to live at the Sayn castle of Löwenburg in the Siebengebirge.

The castle of Waldenburg and the villages of Drolshagen and Meinerzhagen were sold on 20 January 1248 to the Archbishop of Cologne, Conrad of Hochstaden for 2,000 Cologne marks. Mechthild initially held the castles of Altenwied, Neuerburg, Rennenberg and Windeck as well as the villages of Rosbach, Linz, Leubsdorf, Neustadt, Asbach, Winden, Windhagen, Gielsdorf, Sechtem, Nieder- and Oberbreitbach as well as scattered lands and vineyards along the rivers Rhine and Moselle.

On 1 May 1250, Mechthild signed a contract with the Elector of Cologne, Conrad of Hochstaden, at the Neuerburg, according to which all the estates around the castles of Altenwied, Neuerburg, Rennenberg and Windeck passed to the Archbishopric of Cologne after her death in return for a one-off payment of 600 marks and an annual payment of 170 marks. The Neuerburg and the church parish of Breitbach were available for her lifelong use. On 2 March 1261, Conrad's successor, Archbishop Engelbert I renewed the treaty, which was confirmed by Pope Urban IV in 1263.

Mechthild lived at the Neuerburg for a few more years and later moved to Cologne, where she had a residence at Sion Abbey. In 1283, in her will, she decreed that after her death her estate would eventually pass to the Archbishopric. Her date of death is unknown, according to an unconfirmed interpretation of a gravestone in Cologne she may have lived until 1291.

== Deeds ==
The most important foundations and gifts that Mechthild and her husband made were:

- 1215: she found the Sayn Hof in Cologne, which later became Sion Abbey
- 1222: she gifted to Marienstatt Abbey the abbey lands in the Nister valley and goods for its maintenance
- 1231: founding of Seligenthal Abbey near Siegburg
- 1235: founding of Drolshagen Abbey
- numerous smaller gifts, including those to Heisterbach Abbey, where Mechthild's mother, Jutta, was interred.

Mechthild's deeds were often recorded in the German language which was exceptional in the 13th century.

== Literature ==
- Thomas Bohn: Gräfin Mechthild von Sayn (1200/03–1285). Eine Studie zur rheinischen Geschichte und Kultur. Böhlau, Cologne etc., 2002, ISBN 3-412-10901-0 (Rheinisches Archiv 140), (Zugleich: Trier, University, dissertation, 1996).
