= Fockenbach =

River in western Germany

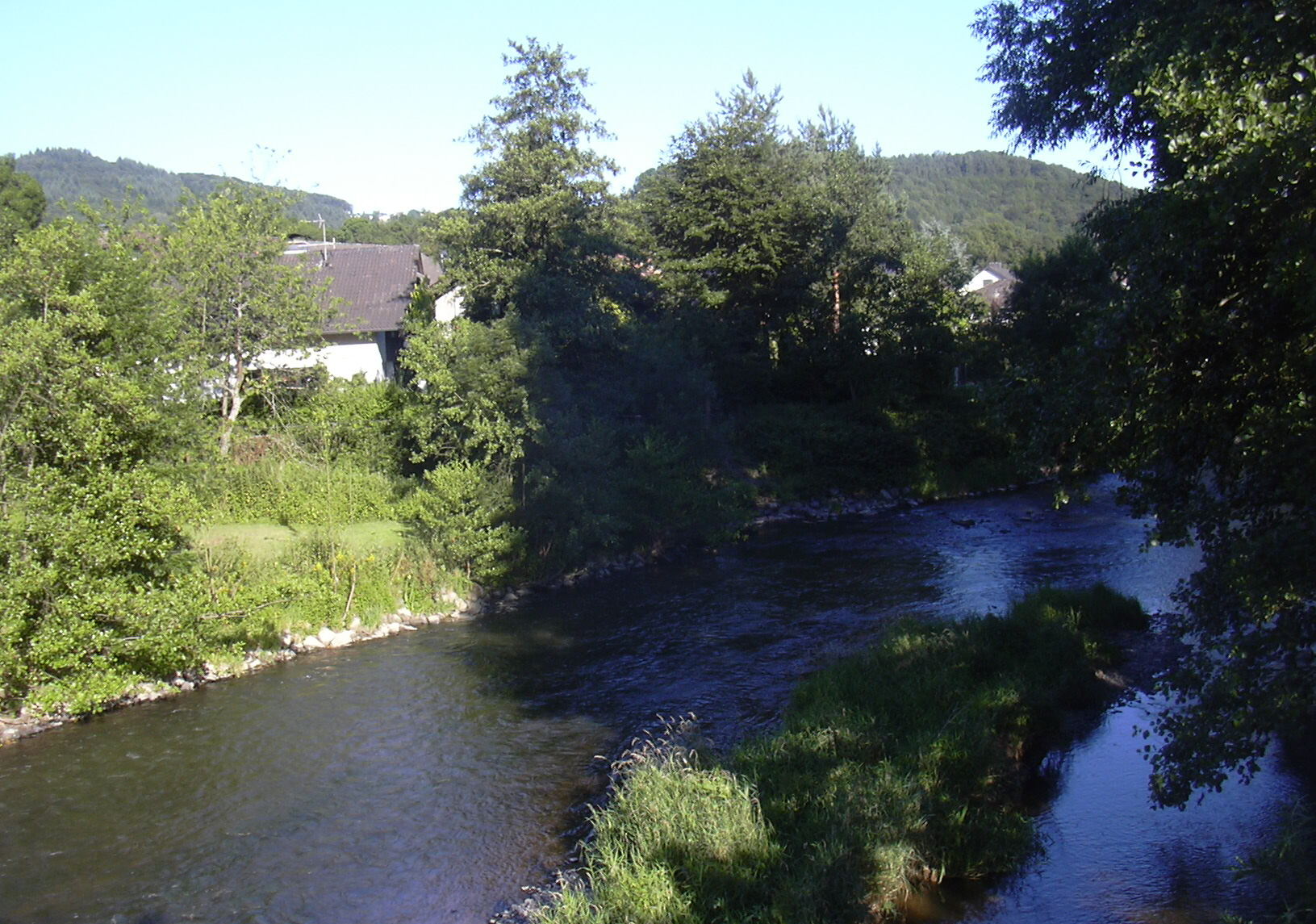
- The Fockenbach discharging into the Wied

Location
- Country: Germany
- State: Rhineland-Palatinate

Physical characteristics
- Source
  - location: East of Straßenhaus and southeast of Niederhonnefeld (parish of Straßenhaus)
  - coordinates: 50.5363°N 7.4939°E
- Mouth
  - location: At Niederbreitbach into the Wied
  - coordinates: 50.5297°N 7.4154°E

Basin features
- Progression: Wied→ Rhine→ North Sea

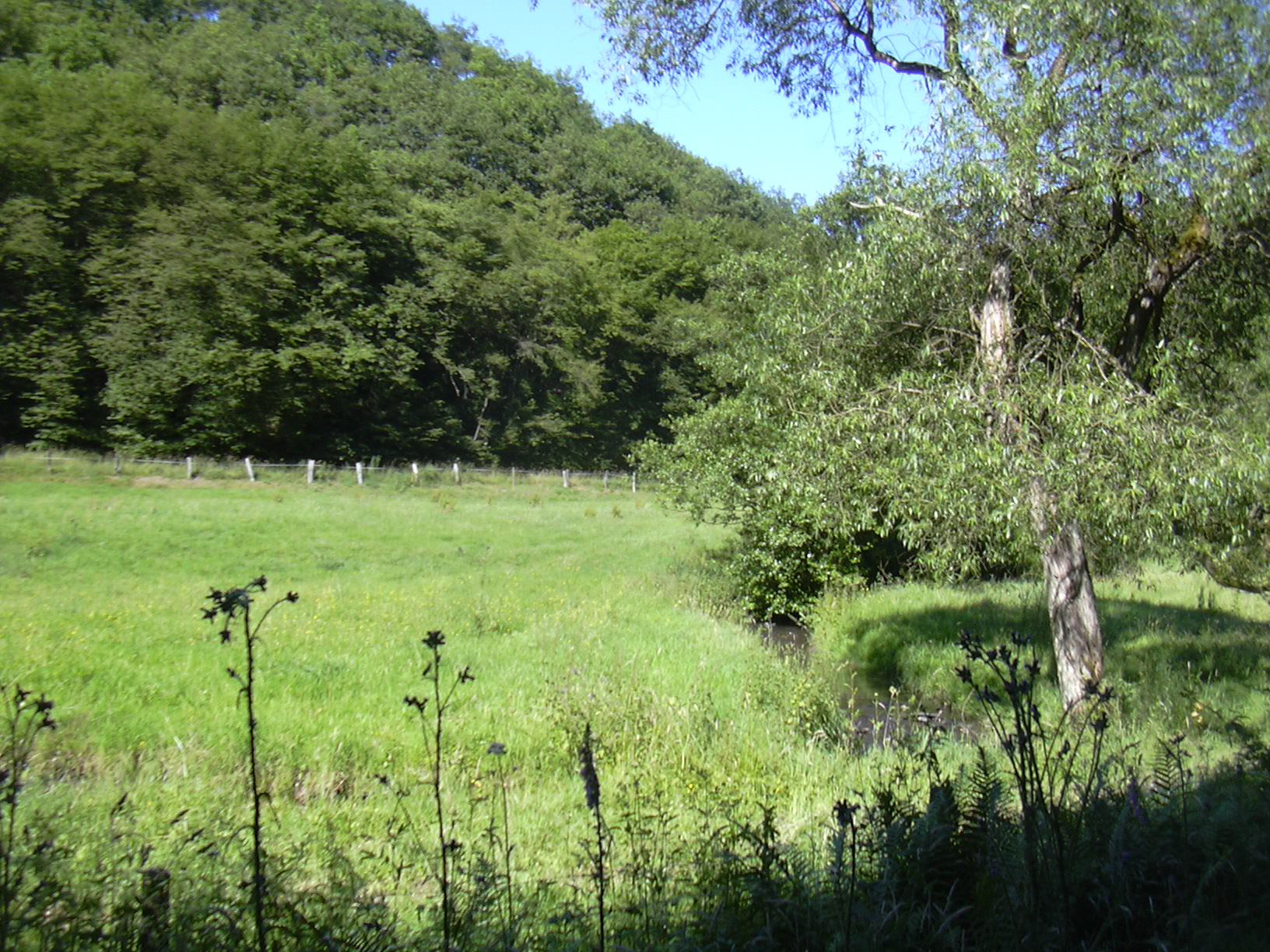
Wet meadow in the Fockenbach valley

Fockenbach is a river of Rhineland-Palatinate, Germany.

The Fockenbach springs east of Straßenhaus and southeast of Niederhonnefeld (a part of Straßenhaus). It discharges at Niederbreitbach into the Wied.

== See also ==
- List of rivers of Rhineland-Palatinate
