= Rosa Flesch =

German Roman Catholic religious

Blessed Rosa Flesch
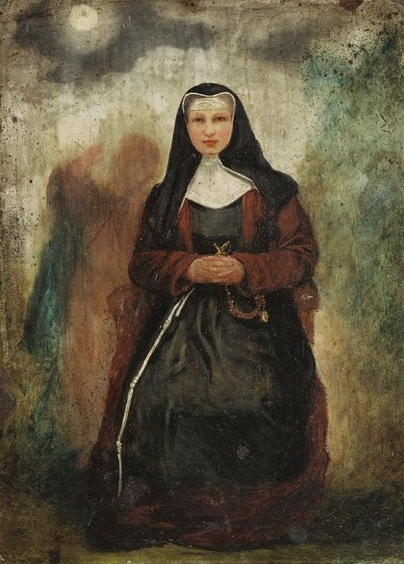
- Born: 24 February 1826; Schönstatt bei Vallendar, Mayen-Koblenz, German Confederation
- Died: 25 March 1906 (aged 80); Waldbreitbach, Neuwied, German Empire
- Venerated in: Roman Catholic Church
- Beatified: 4 May 2008, Trier, Germany by Cardinal Joachim Meisner
- Feast: 19 June

Maria Rosa Flesch (born Margaretha Flesch, 24 February 1826 – 25 March 1906), was a German religious sister in the Roman Catholic Church. She founded the Franciscan Sisters of the Blessed Virgin Mary of the Angels, whose first Mother Superior she was.

Flesch tended to the poor and to the ill as well as orphaned children before becoming a religious sister and also oversaw the construction of both an orphanage and a hospital. Flesch also had practical experience in nursing and worked as a home nurse and a nurse to children.

Her beatification was celebrated on 4 May 2008. Her feast is 19 June, the anniversary of her profession.

== Life ==
Margaretha Flesch was born in 1826 in the German Confederation to Johann Georg Flesch and his wife. Her mother died in 1832 and her father re-married not long after this. She also had seven siblings after her and had three half-siblings from her father's second marriage; one sibling was Maria Anna while one stepbrother was Giles. The death of her mother saw them move elsewhere to Niederbreitbach as a chance to improve their economic fortunes. The death of her father in 1842 forced her to work hard to provide for her stepmother and her siblings. It was around that time she self-taught herself nursing.

In the autumn of 1851 Margaretha left her parents' house and moved with her sister Maria Anna into one of the two hermitages in the Kreuzkapelle on the Wied between Waldbreitbach and Hausen. Conditions in the unheated dwelling during snowy winters were harsh. Between 1852 until 1863 she worked in sewing in different schools but also worked as a nurse at the homes of clients and worked with orphans. In 1850 she met the pastor Jakob Gomm and had her first contacts with the Franciscans around this time. Her devotion to Saint Francis of Assisi was quite strong since her childhood. In 1862 she first met James Wirth and soon after built an orphanage and a hospital. Flesch also attempted to establish her own group of Franciscans – Gomm was hesitant and rejected this.

Flesch's half-brother Giles assisted her in establishing a simple residence that had connected to it a small hospital. Their first home was constructed in the spring of 1861 and Flesch and her sister moved into it on 11 November 1861. Flesch established her own Franciscan congregation on 13 March 1863 and on 19 June 1863 she made her profession and assumed the religious name of Maria Rosa. The approval of the congregation's statutes on 21 October 1869 saw her elected as the first Mother Superior and she kept her office until 1878 in which she did not want to run for re-election. At the time she stepped down there were 100 sisters in a total of 21 branches.

Flesch died on 25 March 1906. The congregation received the decree of praise of Pope Pius X on 12 December 1912 – after her death – and later received the full papal approval of Pope Pius XI on 30 April 1928. As of 2005 there were 392 religious in 39 houses operating in places such as Brazil and the Netherlands.

== Beatification ==
The beatification process commenced in Trier on 18 March 1957 – under Pope Pius XII. The investigation concluded in 1972, giving her title of Servant of God. Following this the diocesan process received ratification from the Congregation for the Causes of Saints in 1999; this meant that Roman officials could begin their own investigations. It also allowed for those overseeing the process to compile and submit the positio to Rome not long after – still in 1999 – to further the cause. The Rome-based theologians approved the cause on 19 April 2005 while the Congregation followed this and also approved it on 6 December 2005. This allowed for Pope Benedict XVI to proclaim Flesch to be venerable on 28 April 2006 upon recognizing her life of heroic virtue. The miracle needed for Flesch's beatification was investigated from 1998 until 1999 in Trier and involved the healing of Monica Schneider in the evenings of 5 and 6 September 1986. The Congregation approved the process of completing its work in 2001 and took possession of the boxes of documents for their own evaluation. It did not receive the approval of the pontiff until 2007. Cardinal Joachim Meisner presided over the beatification on 4 May 2008 on the behalf of Benedict XVI. The postulator assigned to the cause is the Giovangiuseppe Califano OFM.
