= Rhine-Westerwald Nature Park =

Coordinates: 50.546599°N 7.429504°E

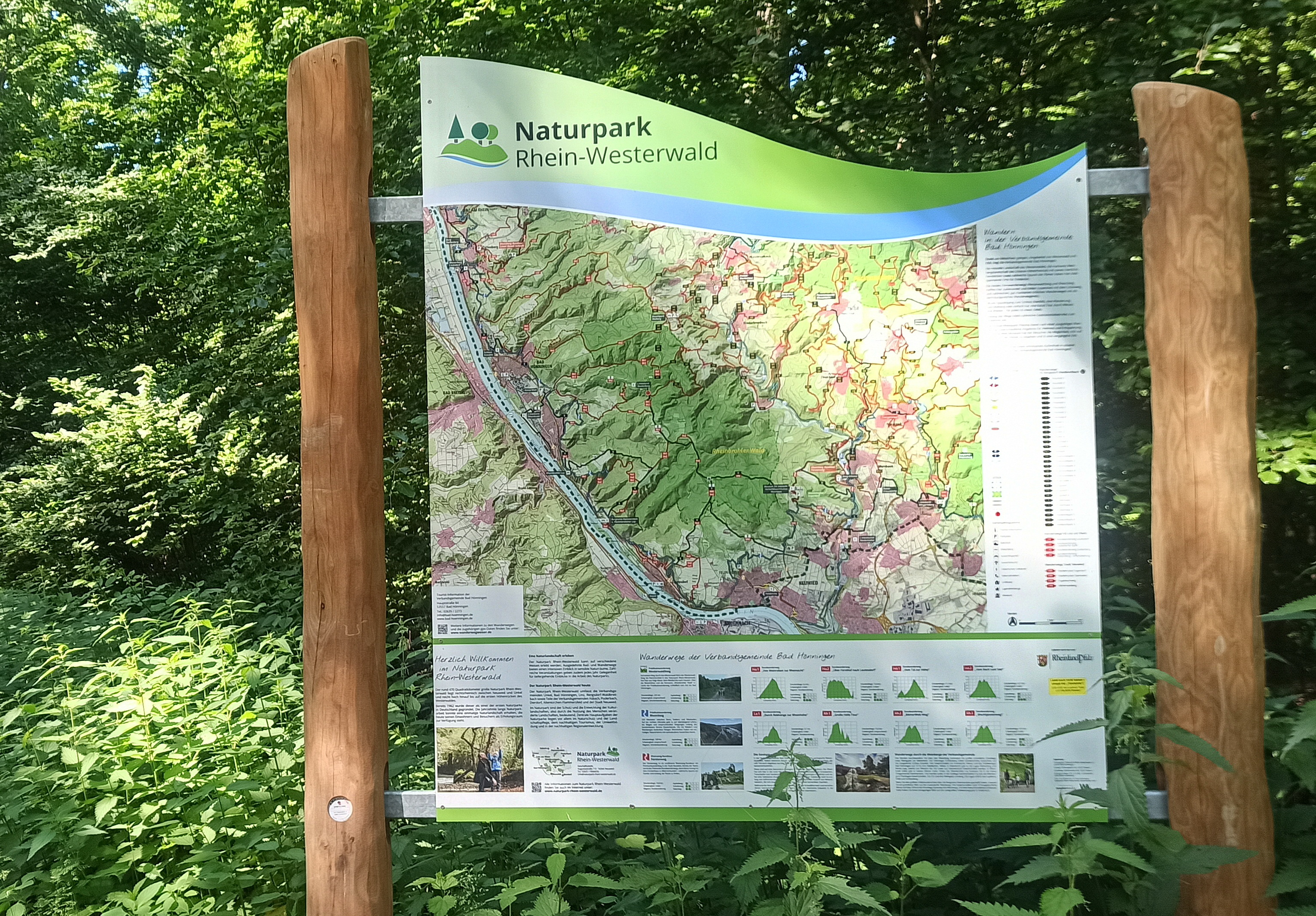
Nature Park information board, Photo taken in 2021

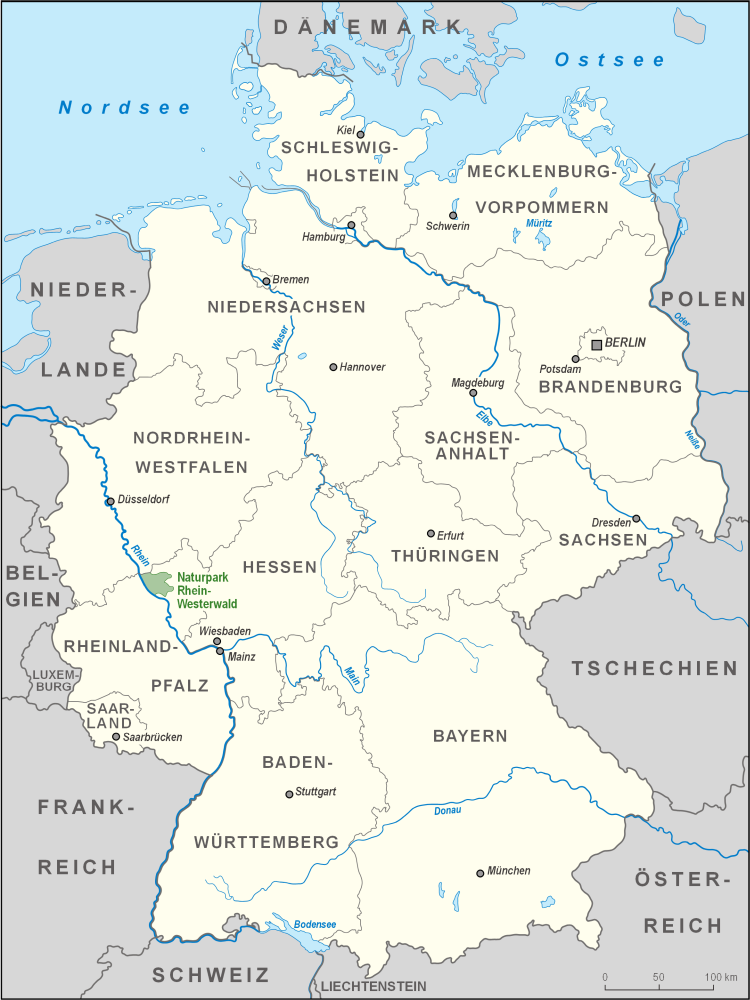
Location of the Rhine-Westerwald Nature Park

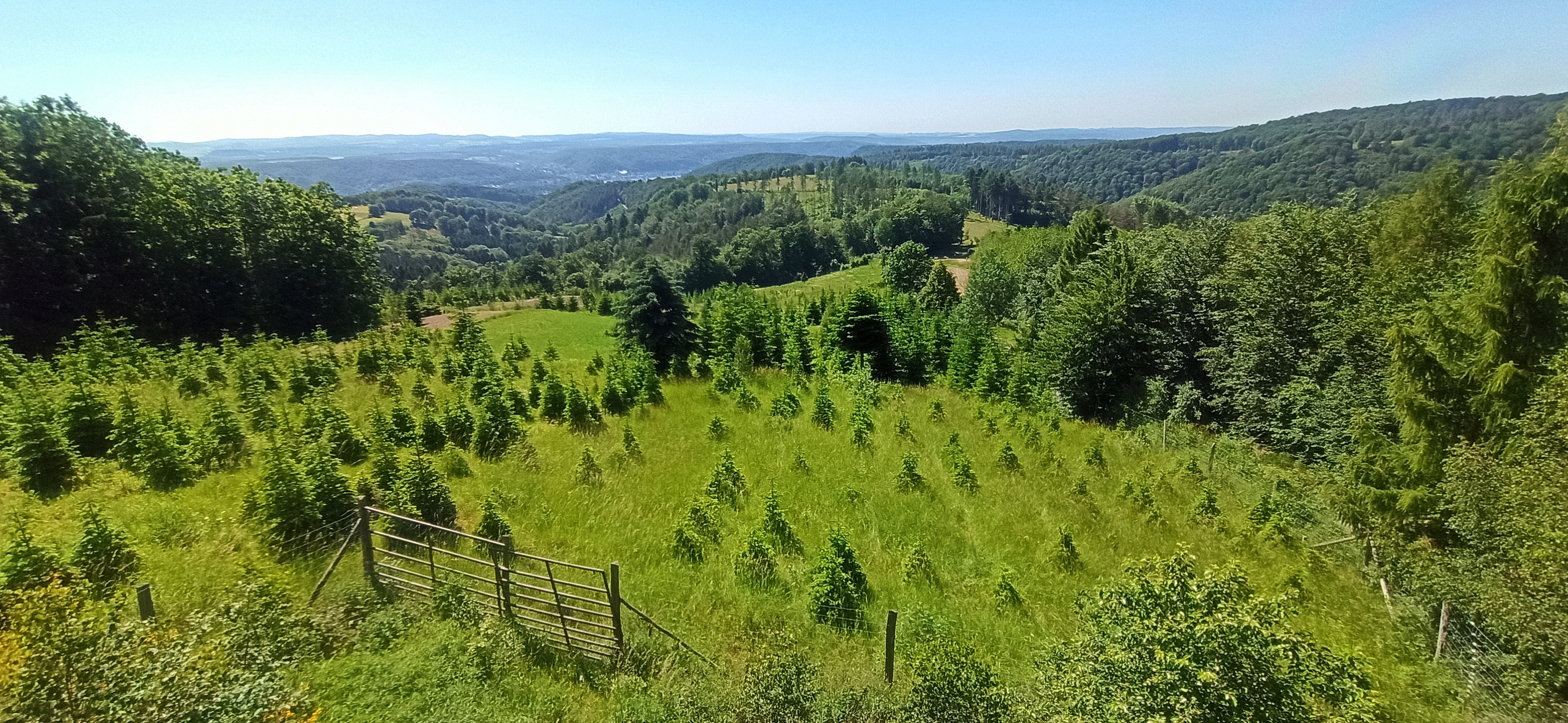
View from the route of the limes (Roman watchtower IX) in Rheinbrohl forest towards the Rhine valley with the Eifel in the background. Photo from June 2021

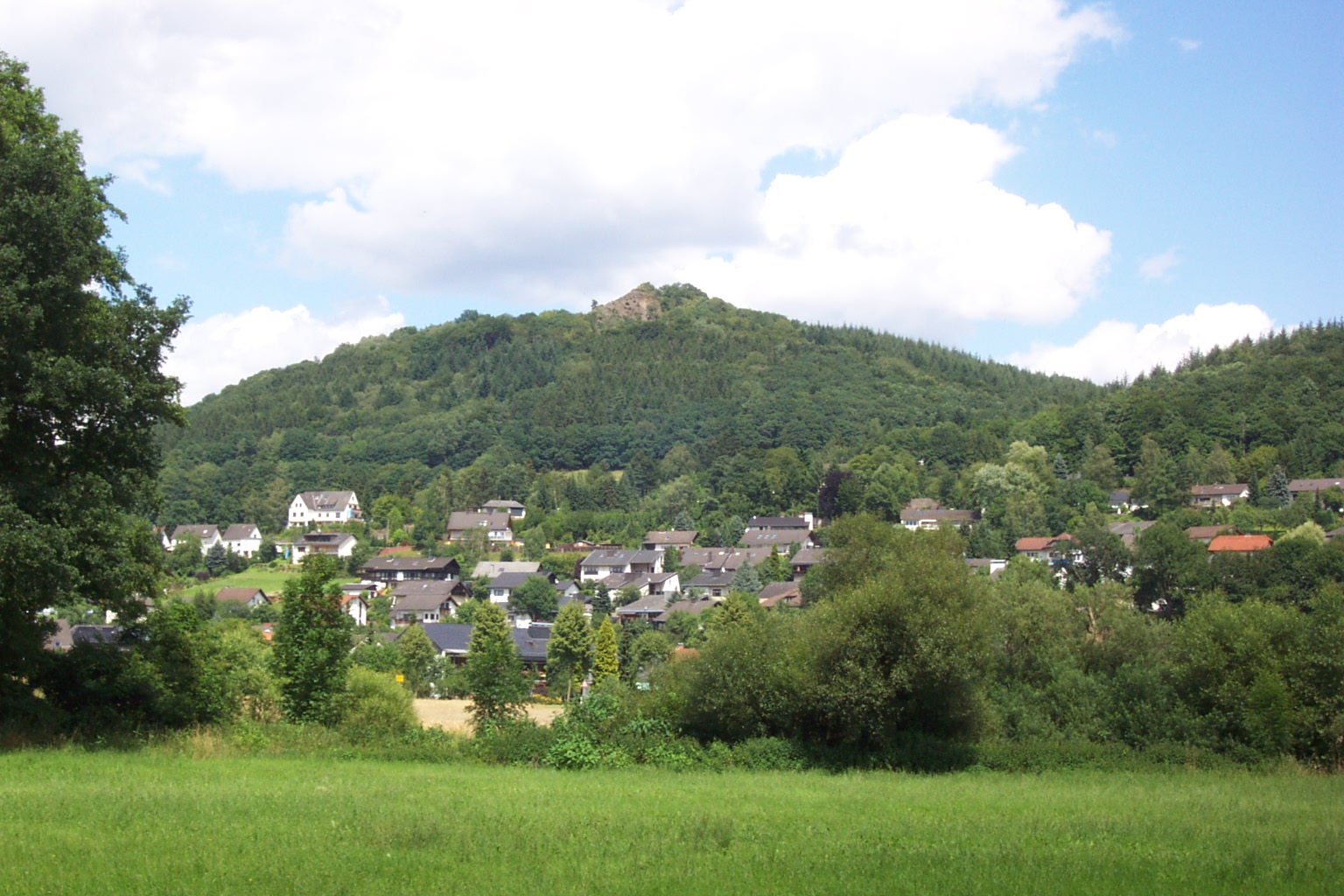
View of Roßbach an der Wied

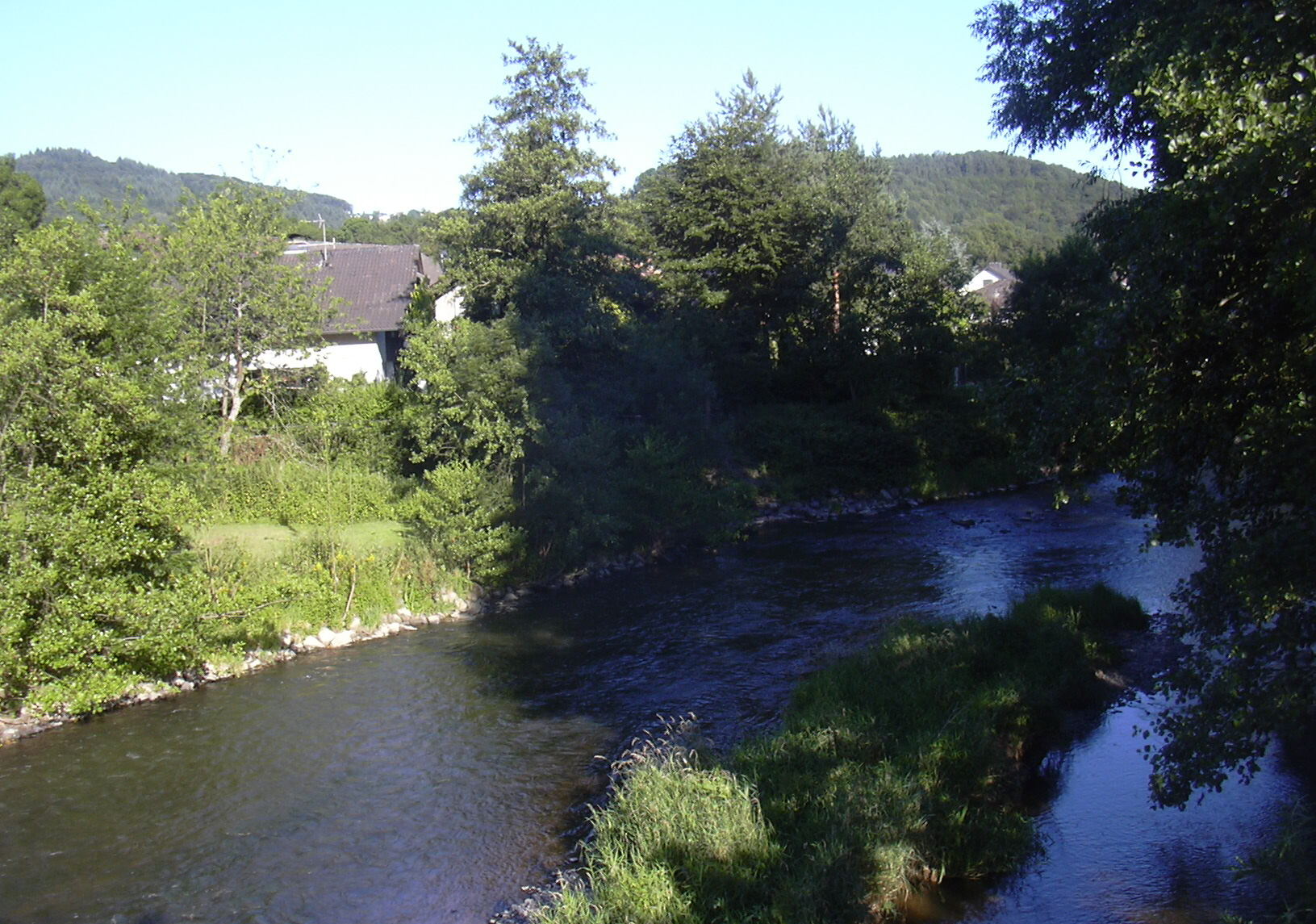
The Wied near Niederbreitbach by its confluence with the Fockenbach

The Rhine-Westerwald Nature Park (German: Naturpark Rhein-Westerwald) is a nature park in Germany that covers an area of around 470 km^{2} to the east of the River Rhine and in the north of the state of Rhineland-Palatinate between Neuwied and Unkel. It extends from the Rhine over its eastern bank terraces up to the first hill ridge of the Lower Westerwald. The Rhine-Westerwald Nature Park is over 60 years old, making it one of the oldest in Germany. It was founded in 1962 and celebrated its 50th anniversary in 2012. Its legal owner is the society of Naturpark Rhein-Westerwald.

== Location ==
The nature park covers parts of the counties of Neuwied and Altenkirchen. The following municipalities and boroughs lie within the nature park:

- Asbach,
- Bad Hönningen,
- Dierdorf,
- Flammersfeld,
- Linz am Rhein,
- Stadt Neuwied,
- Puderbach,
- Rengsdorf,
- Unkel,
- Waldbreitbach.

== General ==
The initial idea and the regulations for the park are defined in an ordinance of the Ministry of Agriculture, Viticulture and Environmental Protection of the state Rhineland-Palatinate dating from 1978. These regulations limit, among other things, the constructions or other human interventions in these natural and cultural landscapes.

The classification as a Natural Park gives priority to the preservation of the beauty and peculiarities of the landscapes, to maintain the particular value that this region offers for relaxation and recreation. Thus, the slopes (largely winegrowing) to the right of the Rhine as well as the foothills of the Westerwald (part of the Rhine schistose massif) are protected from Neuwied to the northern limit of Rhineland-Palatinate.

== See also ==
- List of nature parks in Germany
