= Laubach (Wied) =

River in Germany

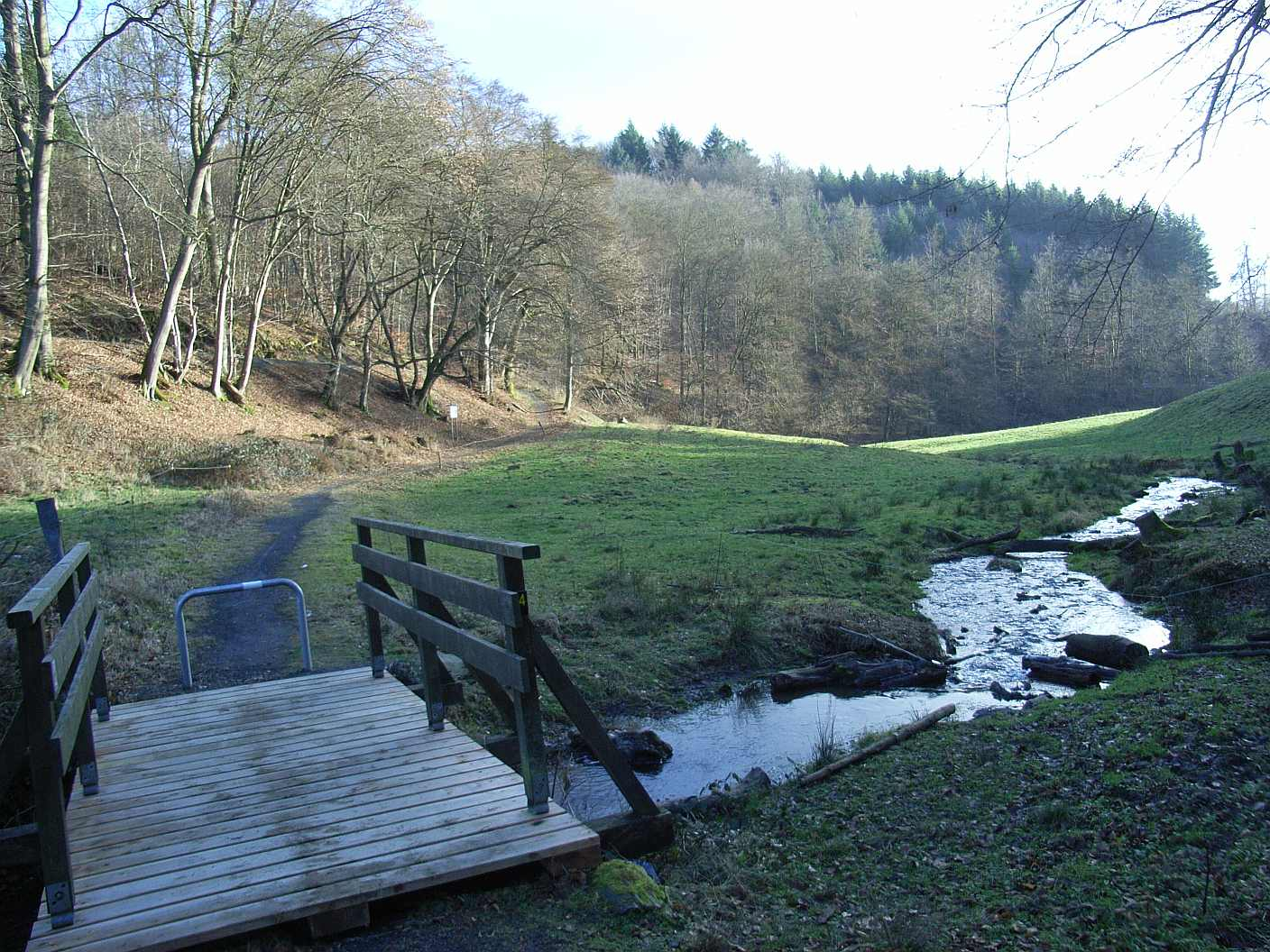
- The Laubach between Rengsdorf and Ehlscheid

Location
- Country: Germany
- State: Rhineland-Palatinate

Physical characteristics
- Mouth: Wied
  - location: Near Melsbach
  - coordinates: 50°29′42″N 7°28′13″E

Basin features
- Progression: Wied→ Rhine→ North Sea

Laubach (German pronunciation: [ˈlaʊbax]) is a river of Rhineland-Palatinate, Germany. It is a left tributary of the Wied near Melsbach and Altwied.

The Laubach at Melsbach

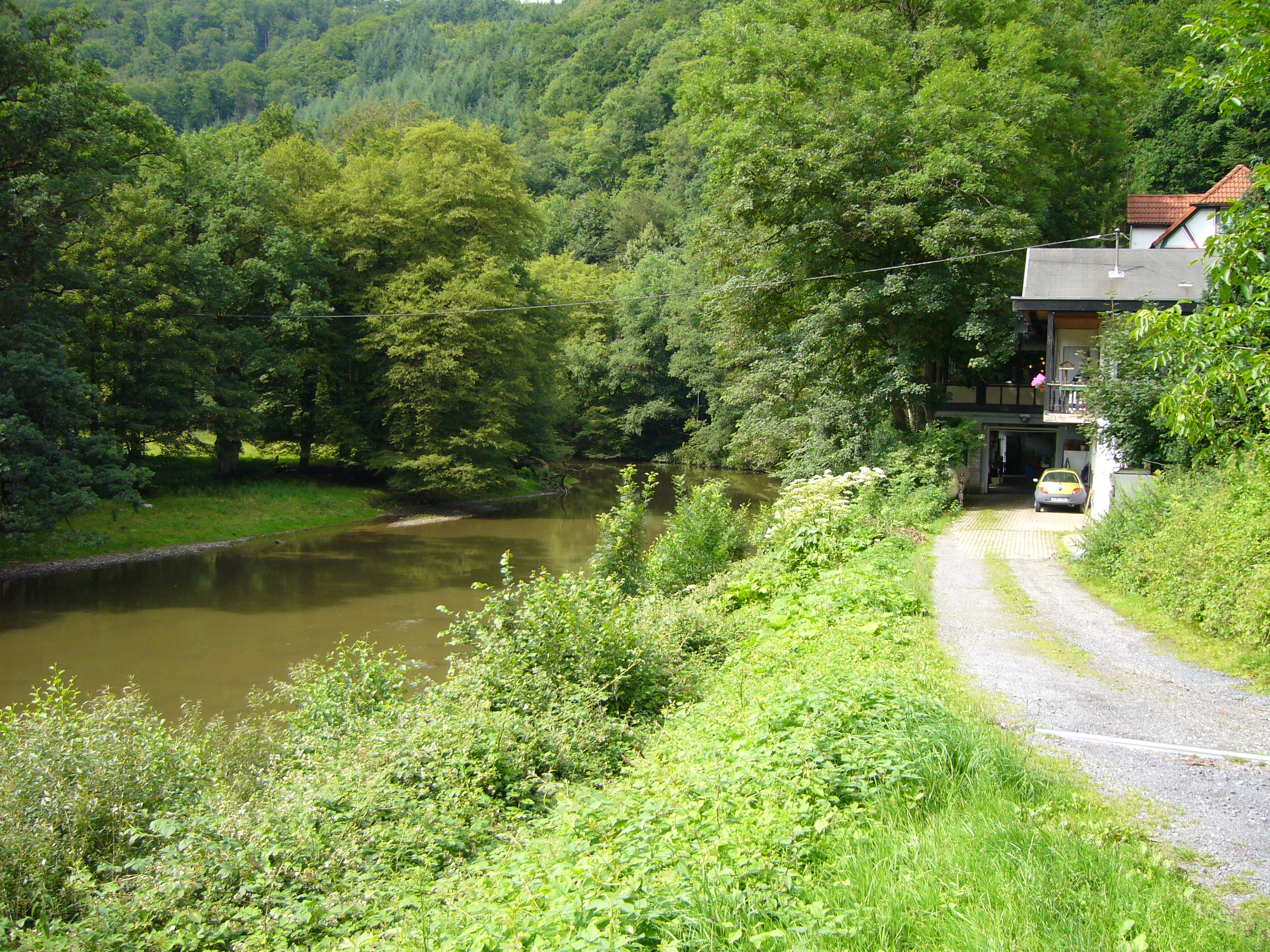
The Wied and the Laubachsmühle, a former powder mill driven by the Laubach near its mouth

== See also ==
- List of rivers of Rhineland-Palatinate
