= Laubach (surname) =

Laubach is a surname. Notable people with the surname include:

- Claire Laubach (born 1983), American field hockey player
- Frank Laubach (1884–1970), Christian missionary and literacy advocate
- Mark Laubach, American engineer
- Thomas Laubach (after marriage Thomas Weißer, born 1964), German Catholic theologian and hymnwriter
- Tony Laubach (born 1980), American professional storm chaser and meteorologist
