= Rengsdorf-Waldbreitbach =

Municipality in Rhineland-Palatinate, Germany

- Verbandsgemeinde
- Location of Rengsdorf-Waldbreitbach within Neuwied district
- Interactive map of Rengsdorf-Waldbreitbach
- Location within Germany Location within Rhineland-Palatinate
- Coordinates: 50°30′N 7°30′E
- Country: Germany
- State: Rhineland-Palatinate
- District: Neuwied
- Seat: Rengsdorf
- Subdivisions: 20 municipalities

Area
  - Total: 124.2 km^{2} (48.0 sq mi)

Population (2025-12-31)
  - Total: 26,664
  - Density: 214.7/km^{2} (556.0/sq mi)
- Time zone: UTC+01:00 (CET)
  - Summer (DST): UTC+02:00 (CEST)
- Website: www.rengsdorf-waldbreitbach.de

Rengsdorf-Waldbreitbach is a Verbandsgemeinde ("collective municipality") in the district of Neuwied, in Rhineland-Palatinate, Germany. The seat of the Verbandsgemeinde is in Rengsdorf. It was formed on 1 January 2018 by the merger of the former Verbandsgemeinden Rengsdorf and Waldbreitbach.

The Verbandsgemeinde Rengsdorf-Waldbreitbach consists of the following Ortsgemeinden ("local municipalities"):

1. Anhausen
2. Bonefeld
3. Breitscheid
4. Datzeroth
5. Ehlscheid
6. Hardert
7. Hausen (Wied)
8. Hümmerich
9. Kurtscheid
10. Meinborn
11. Melsbach
12. Niederbreitbach
13. Oberhonnefeld-Gierend
14. Oberraden
15. Rengsdorf
16. Roßbach
17. Rüscheid
18. Straßenhaus
19. Thalhausen
20. Waldbreitbach
