= Rüscheid =

- Municipality
- Coat of arms

- Location of Rüscheid within Neuwied district
- Interactive map of Rüscheid
- Location within Germany Location within Rhineland-Palatinate
- Coordinates: 50°31′19″N 7°34′02″E
- Country: Germany
- State: Rhineland-Palatinate
- District: Neuwied
- Municipal assoc.: Rengsdorf-Waldbreitbach

Government
  - Mayor (2023–24): Marcus Asbach

Area
  - Total: 4.9 km^{2} (1.9 sq mi)
- Elevation: 359 m (1,178 ft)

Population (2025-12-31)
  - Total: 831
  - Density: 170/km^{2} (440/sq mi)
- Time zone: UTC+01:00 (CET)
  - Summer (DST): UTC+02:00 (CEST)
- Postal codes: 56584
- Dialling codes: 02639
- Vehicle registration: NR
- Website: www.ruescheid.de

Rüscheid (German pronunciation: [ˈʁyːʃaɪt]) is a municipality in the district of Neuwied, in Rhineland-Palatinate, Germany.
