= Kurtscheid =

- Municipality
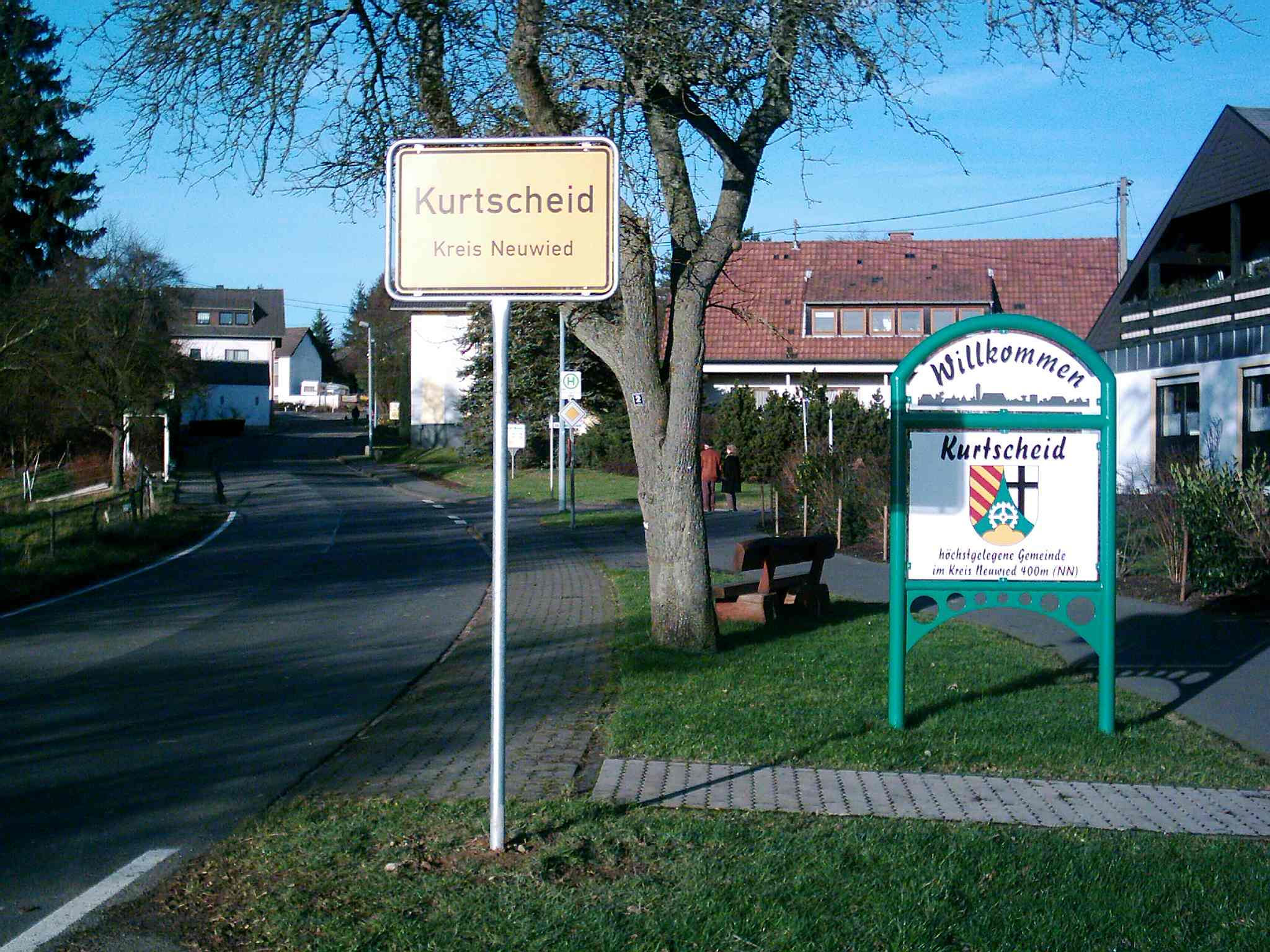
- Entry of the village

- Coat of arms

- Location of Kurtscheid within Neuwied district
- Interactive map of Kurtscheid
- Location within Germany Location within Rhineland-Palatinate
- Coordinates: 50°32′12″N 07°27′57″E
- Country: Germany
- State: Rhineland-Palatinate
- District: Neuwied
- Municipal assoc.: Rengsdorf-Waldbreitbach

Government
  - Mayor (2019–24): Ferdinand Wittlich

Area
  - Total: 5.1 km^{2} (2.0 sq mi)
- Elevation: 383 m (1,257 ft)

Population (2025-12-31)
  - Total: 1,007
  - Density: 200/km^{2} (510/sq mi)
- Time zone: UTC+01:00 (CET)
  - Summer (DST): UTC+02:00 (CEST)
- Postal codes: 56581
- Dialling codes: 02634
- Vehicle registration: NR
- Website: www.kurtscheid.de

Kurtscheid (German pronunciation: [ˈkʊʁtˌʃaɪt]) is a municipality in the district of Neuwied, in northern Rhineland-Palatinate, Germany. The village is located in the natural preserve Rhein-Westerwald. Kurtscheid is 401 metres above sea level and is hence the highest municipality in the district of Neuwied.

== History ==
In 1314, the village was officially mentioned for the first time as "Curtsheit".

During the time of the Protestant reformation, Kurtscheid was situated on the border of the County of Wied and the Archbishopric of Cologne. In 1546, the Count of Wied decided to select Lutheranism as the general religion within his county. Thus, following the agreement of the Peace Treaty of Augsburg, all inhabitants of his county had to convert their religion accordingly. However, the citizens of Kurtscheid did not want to convert. Therefore, they demolished 11 houses which were situated on the duke's territory and rebuilt them on the archbishop's catholic part of the village. Kurtscheid stayed catholic and for the following centuries, a confessional border divided it from its Protestant neighbours.

== Politics ==
The parish council consists of 12 members and the honorary mayor.

Seating in the elected council:

	CDU	SPD	FWG	Total
2009	9	0	7	16 seats

(Status: local elections on June 7, 2009)

== Coat of arms ==
The crossed bars taken from the coat of arms of the County of Wied and the black cross coming from the Archbishopric of Cologne's coat are reminders of the century-long separation of Kurtscheid into parts belonging to the County of Wied and to Cologne, respectively. The mountain with three hills represents Kurtscheid's geographic position as highest municipality in the district of Neuwied. The golden colour symbolises agriculture life while the green colour indicates the grand amount of forests covering the municipality's territory. The silvern gear wheel represents both the former silver and iron ore mines and today's industry.

== Economy and Infra structure ==
- The B 256 leading from Neuwied to Altenkirchen passes the village in the east.
- The next junction of autobahn A3 is called Neuwied.
- The next high speed (ICE) train station is in Montabaur, serving the link Cologne - Frankfurt.
