= Roßbach, Neuwied =

Roßbach
- Municipality
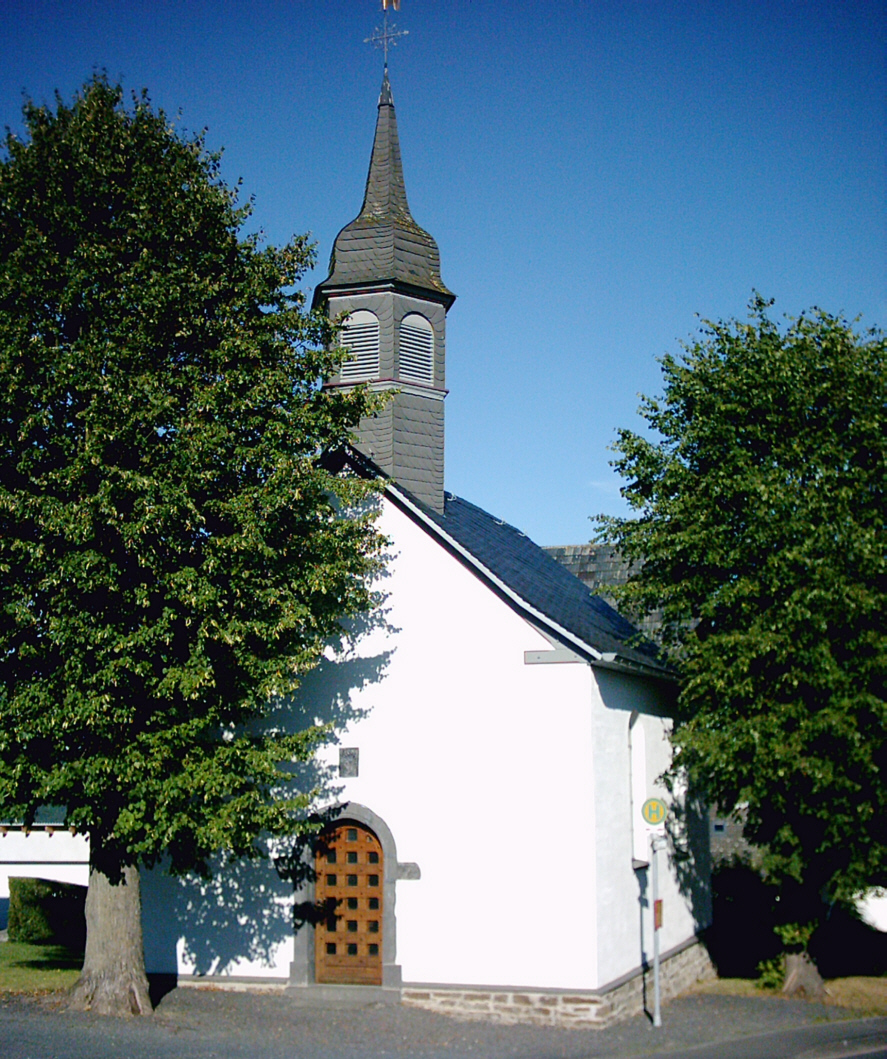

- Coat of arms

- Location of Roßbach within Neuwied district
- Interactive map of Roßbach
- Location within Germany Location within Rhineland-Palatinate
- Coordinates: 50°34′30″N 7°24′58″E
- Country: Germany
- State: Rhineland-Palatinate
- District: Neuwied
- Municipal assoc.: Rengsdorf-Waldbreitbach
- Subdivisions: 7

Government
  - Mayor (2020–24): Claudia Lo Iacono

Area
  - Total: 6.4 km^{2} (2.5 sq mi)
- Elevation: 116 m (381 ft)

Population (2025-12-31)
  - Total: 1,457
  - Density: 230/km^{2} (590/sq mi)
- Time zone: UTC+01:00 (CET)
  - Summer (DST): UTC+02:00 (CEST)
- Postal codes: 53547
- Dialling codes: 02638
- Vehicle registration: NR
- Website: www.rossbach-wied.de

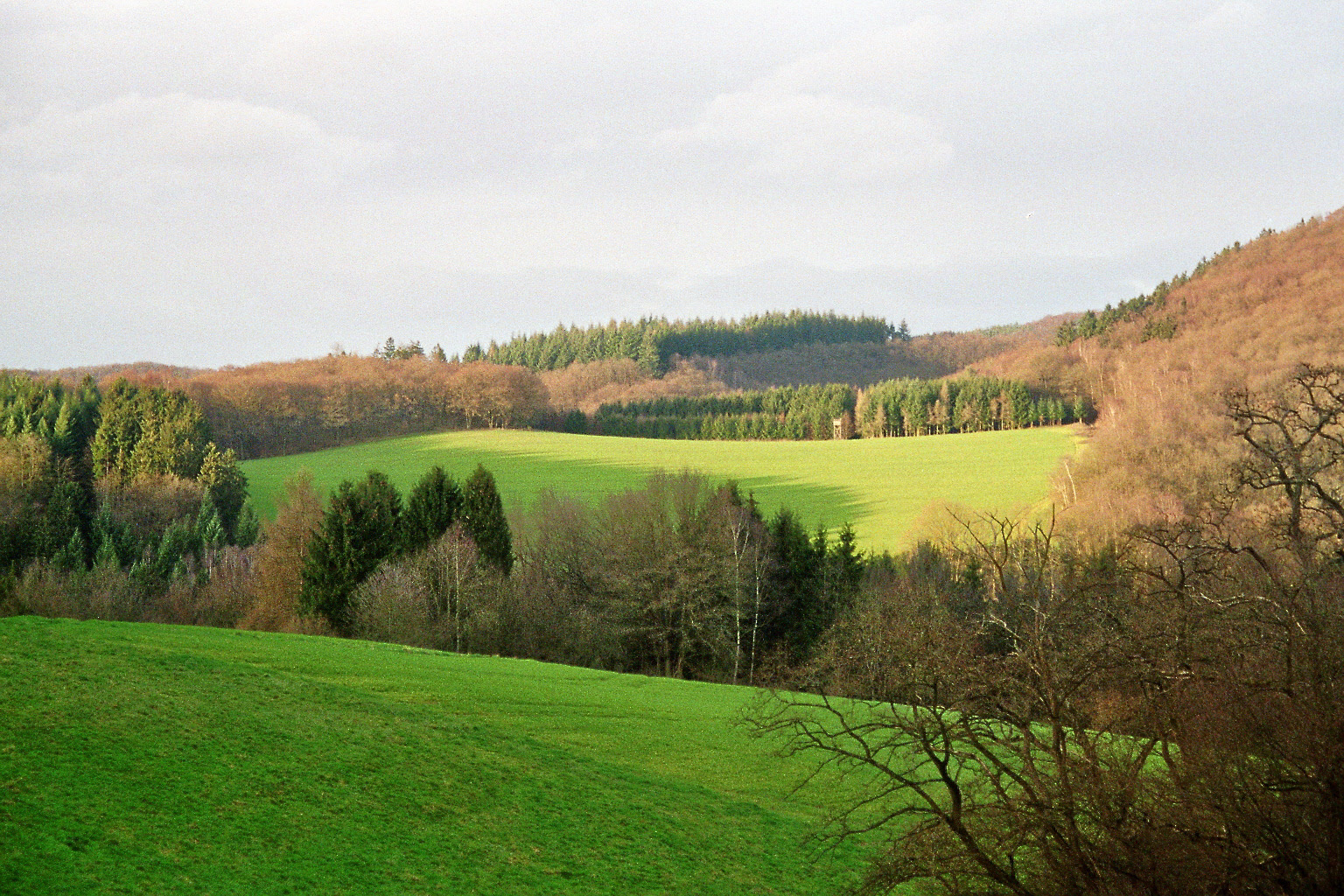
near Schimmelshahn in Roßbach

Roßbach (German pronunciation: [ˈʁoːsˌbax]) is a municipality in the district of Neuwied, in Rhineland-Palatinate, Germany. It is situated on the river Wied.

The municipality is spelled with an ß which may be replaced by ss if not available (Rossbach).
