= Hümmerich =

- Municipality
- Coat of arms

- Location of Hümmerich within Neuwied district
- Interactive map of Hümmerich
- Location within Germany Location within Rhineland-Palatinate
- Coordinates: 50°34′07″N 07°29′47″E
- Country: Germany
- State: Rhineland-Palatinate
- District: Neuwied
- Municipal assoc.: Rengsdorf-Waldbreitbach

Government
  - Mayor (2019–24): Achim Schmidt

Area
  - Total: 4.27 km^{2} (1.65 sq mi)
- Elevation: 330 m (1,080 ft)

Population (2025-12-31)
  - Total: 808
  - Density: 189/km^{2} (490/sq mi)
- Time zone: UTC+01:00 (CET)
  - Summer (DST): UTC+02:00 (CEST)
- Postal codes: 53547
- Dialling codes: 02687
- Vehicle registration: NR
- Website: www.huemmerich-ww.de

Hümmerich (German pronunciation: [ˈhʏməʁɪç]) is a municipality in the district of Neuwied, in Rhineland-Palatinate, Germany.
