= Michelbach, Altenkirchen =

Michelbach
- Municipality
- Coat of arms

- Location of Michelbach within Altenkirchen (Westerwald) district
- Interactive map of Michelbach
- Location within Germany Location within Rhineland-Palatinate
- Coordinates: 50°41′00″N 7°39′46″E
- Country: Germany
- State: Rhineland-Palatinate
- District: Altenkirchen (Westerwald)
- Municipal assoc.: Altenkirchen-Flammersfeld

Government
  - Mayor (2021–24): Alexandra Schleiden

Area
  - Total: 4.43 km^{2} (1.71 sq mi)
- Elevation: 230 m (750 ft)

Population (2025-12-31)
  - Total: 552
  - Density: 125/km^{2} (323/sq mi)
- Time zone: UTC+01:00 (CET)
  - Summer (DST): UTC+02:00 (CEST)
- Postal codes: 57610
- Dialling codes: 02681
- Vehicle registration: AK
- Website: www.michelbach-westerwald.de

Michelbach (German: [ˈmɪçl̩ˌbax]) is a municipality in the district of Altenkirchen, in Rhineland-Palatinate, Germany.

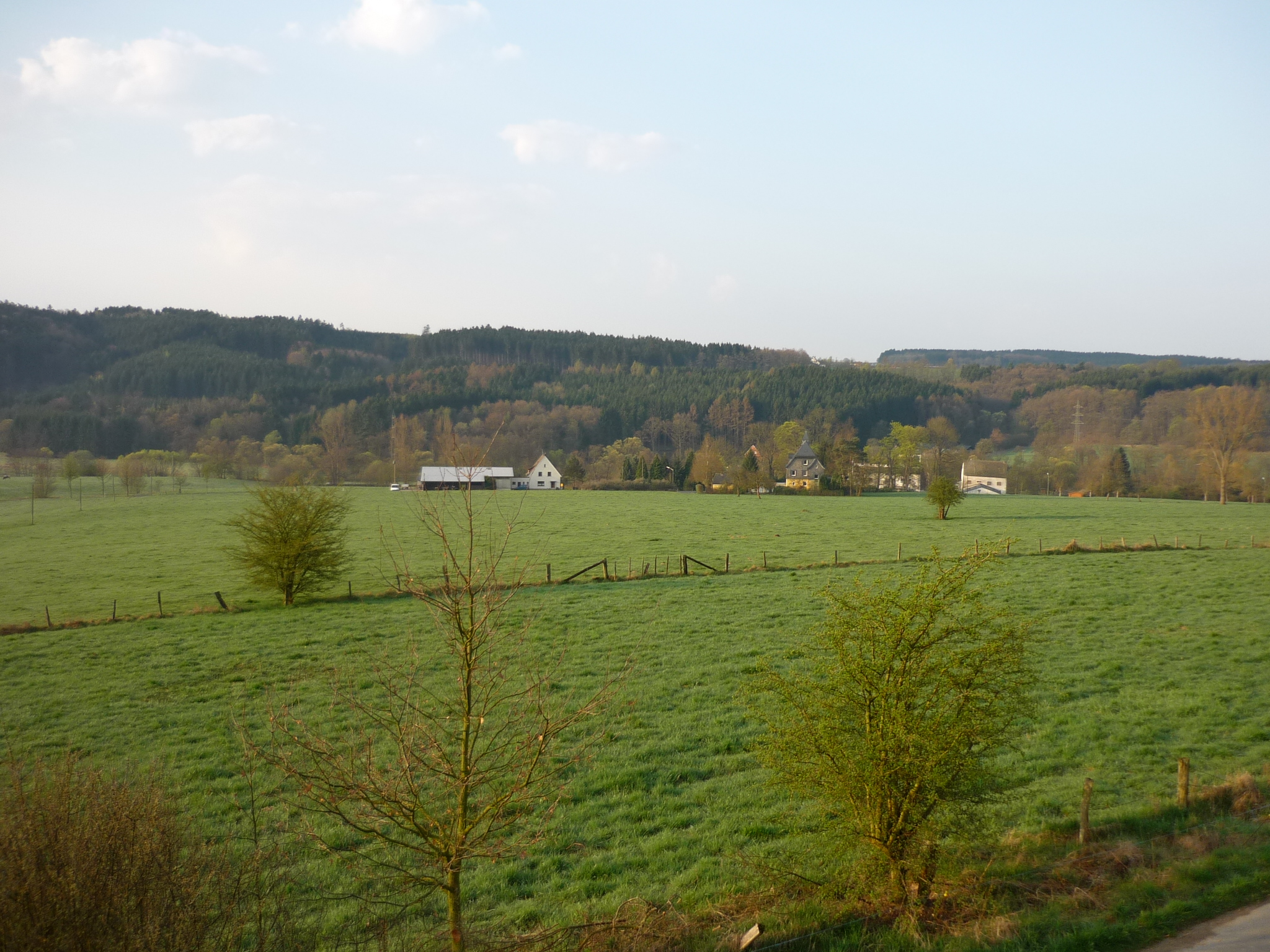
Michelbach

== Transport ==
Michelbach is connected to the public transport through the local bus lines 123 and 124.
