= Mark Laubach =

American engineer

Mark Laubach is an electrical engineer with Broadcom Corporation in Irvine, California. He was named a Fellow of the Institute of Electrical and Electronics Engineers (IEEE) in 2016 for his leadership in the design and standardization of cable modems.
