= Hardert =

- Municipality
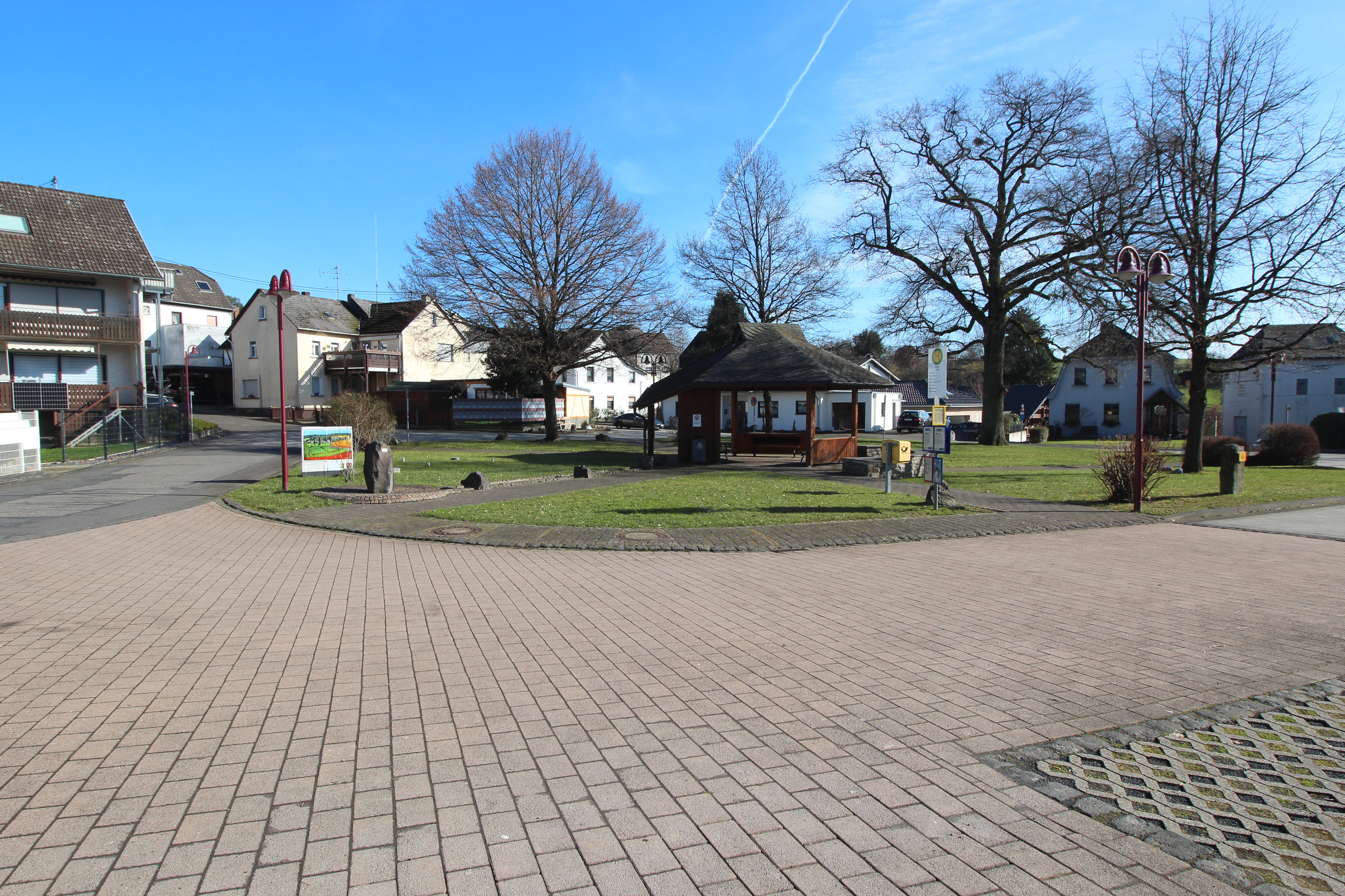

- Coat of arms

- Location of Hardert within Neuwied district
- Interactive map of Hardert
- Location within Germany Location within Rhineland-Palatinate
- Coordinates: 50°31′07″N 07°31′04″E
- Country: Germany
- State: Rhineland-Palatinate
- District: Neuwied
- Municipal assoc.: Rengsdorf-Waldbreitbach

Government
  - Mayor (2019–24): Heiko Schlosser

Area
  - Total: 3.44 km^{2} (1.33 sq mi)
- Elevation: 300 m (980 ft)

Population (2025-12-31)
  - Total: 847
  - Density: 246/km^{2} (638/sq mi)
- Time zone: UTC+01:00 (CET)
  - Summer (DST): UTC+02:00 (CEST)
- Postal codes: 56579
- Dialling codes: 02634
- Vehicle registration: NR
- Website: www.hardert.de

Hardert is a municipality in the district of Neuwied, in Rhineland-Palatinate, Germany.
