= Meinborn =

- Municipality
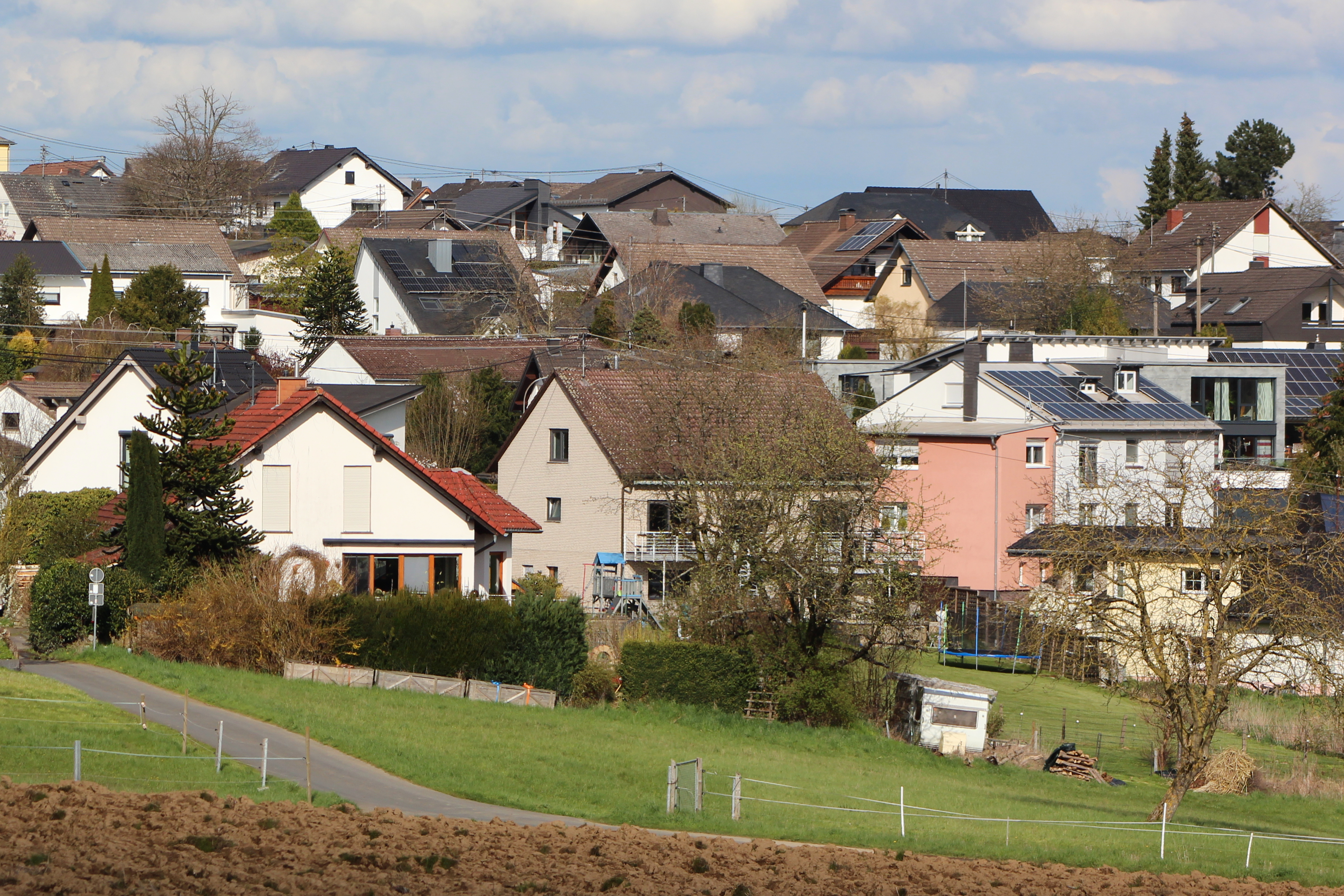

- Coat of arms

- Location of Meinborn within Neuwied district
- Interactive map of Meinborn
- Location within Germany Location within Rhineland-Palatinate
- Coordinates: 50°29′51″N 07°33′39″E
- Country: Germany
- State: Rhineland-Palatinate
- District: Neuwied
- Municipal assoc.: Rengsdorf-Waldbreitbach

Government
  - Mayor (2019–24): Helmut Blasius

Area
  - Total: 4.39 km^{2} (1.69 sq mi)
- Elevation: 315 m (1,033 ft)

Population (2025-12-31)
  - Total: 561
  - Density: 128/km^{2} (331/sq mi)
- Time zone: UTC+01:00 (CET)
  - Summer (DST): UTC+02:00 (CEST)
- Postal codes: 56584
- Dialling codes: 02639
- Vehicle registration: NR
- Website: www.Meinborn.de

Meinborn (German pronunciation: [ˈmaɪnbɔʁn]) is a municipality in the district of Neuwied, in Rhineland-Palatinate, Germany.
