= Oberraden =

- Municipality
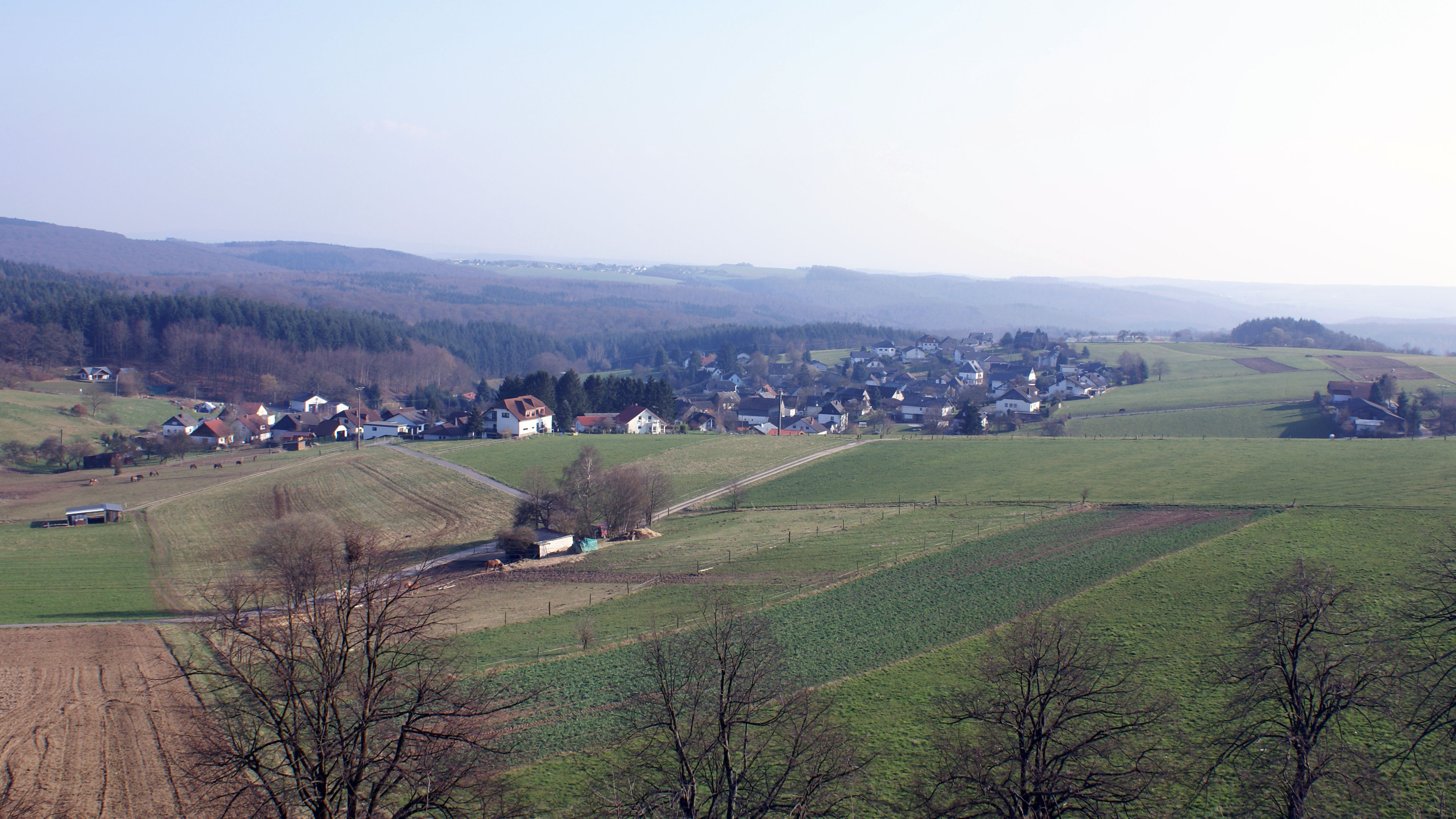

- Coat of arms

- Location of Oberraden within Neuwied district
- Interactive map of Oberraden
- Location within Germany Location within Rhineland-Palatinate
- Coordinates: 50°33′01″N 07°32′07″E
- Country: Germany
- State: Rhineland-Palatinate
- District: Neuwied
- Municipal assoc.: Rengsdorf-Waldbreitbach

Government
  - Mayor (2019–24): Achim Braasch

Area
  - Total: 4.33 km^{2} (1.67 sq mi)
- Elevation: 350 m (1,150 ft)

Population (2025-12-31)
  - Total: 659
  - Density: 152/km^{2} (394/sq mi)
- Time zone: UTC+01:00 (CET)
  - Summer (DST): UTC+02:00 (CEST)
- Postal codes: 56587
- Dialling codes: 02634
- Vehicle registration: NR
- Website: www.oberraden.de

Oberraden is a municipality in the district of Neuwied, in Rhineland-Palatinate, Germany.

A local government reform from 17 May 1974 united the former independent municipalities Oberraden and Niederraden forming the present Oberraden. Niederraden is not to be confused with Niederraden in the Eifel.
