= Thalhausen =

Municipality in Rhineland-Palatinate, Germany

- Municipality
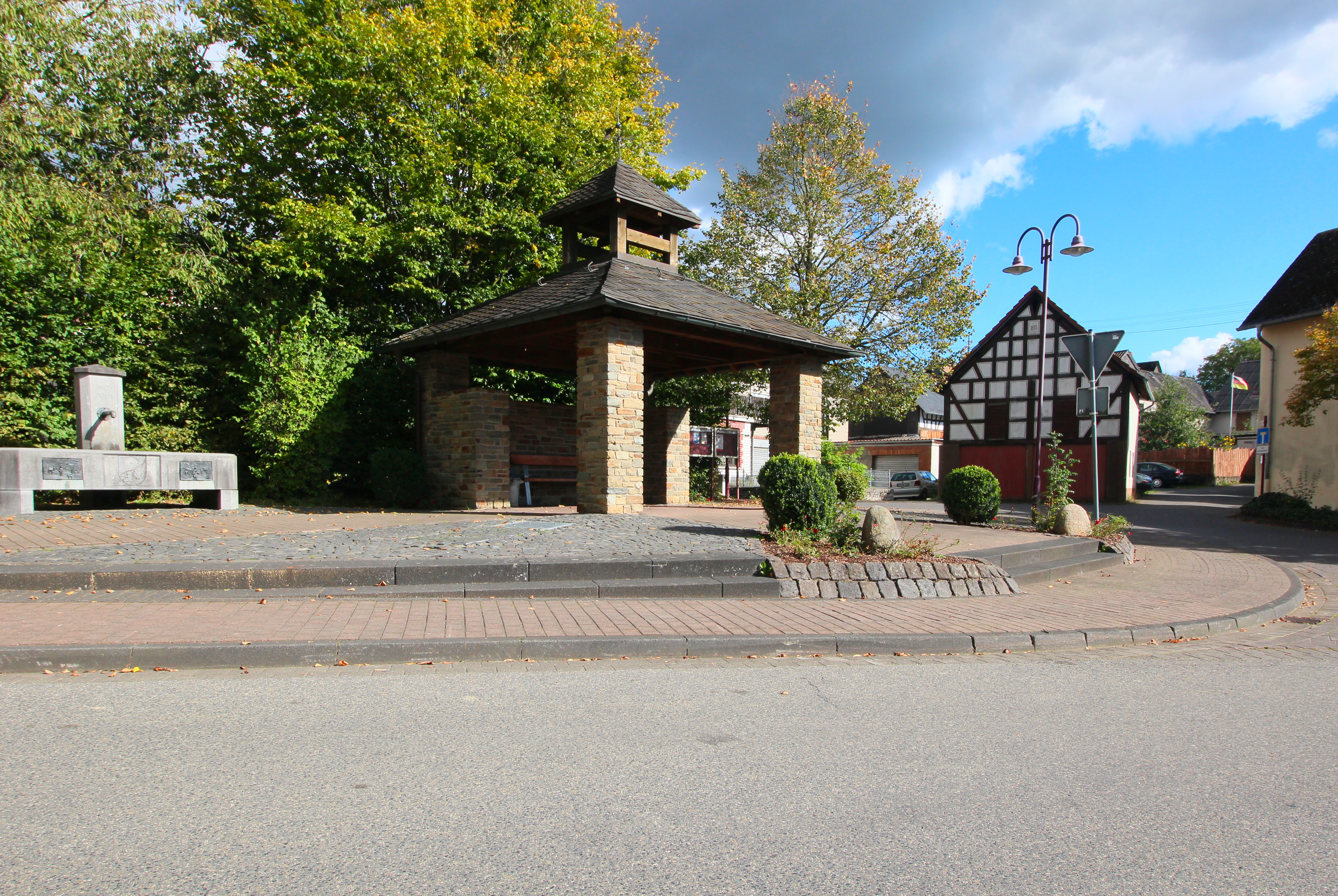

- Coat of arms

- Location of Thalhausen within Neuwied district
- Interactive map of Thalhausen
- Location within Germany Location within Rhineland-Palatinate
- Coordinates: 50°30′11″N 07°35′10″E
- Country: Germany
- State: Rhineland-Palatinate
- District: Neuwied
- Municipal assoc.: Rengsdorf-Waldbreitbach

Government
  - Mayor (2019–24): Rolf Kurz

Area
  - Total: 3.66 km^{2} (1.41 sq mi)
- Elevation: 280 m (920 ft)

Population (2025-12-31)
  - Total: 770
  - Density: 210/km^{2} (540/sq mi)
- Time zone: UTC+01:00 (CET)
  - Summer (DST): UTC+02:00 (CEST)
- Postal codes: 56584
- Dialling codes: 02639
- Vehicle registration: NR
- Website: www.Thalhausen.de

Thalhausen is a municipality in the district of Neuwied, in Rhineland-Palatinate, Germany.
