= Datzeroth =

- Municipality
- Coat of arms

- Location of Datzeroth within Neuwied district
- Interactive map of Datzeroth
- Location within Germany Location within Rhineland-Palatinate
- Coordinates: 50°30′24″N 7°25′41″E
- Country: Germany
- State: Rhineland-Palatinate
- District: Neuwied
- Municipal assoc.: Rengsdorf-Waldbreitbach

Government
  - Mayor (2019–24): Kirsten Hardt

Area
  - Total: 8.01 km^{2} (3.09 sq mi)
- Elevation: 94 m (308 ft)

Population (2025-12-31)
  - Total: 291
  - Density: 36.3/km^{2} (94.1/sq mi)
- Time zone: UTC+01:00 (CET)
  - Summer (DST): UTC+02:00 (CEST)
- Postal codes: 56589
- Dialling codes: 02638
- Vehicle registration: NR
- Website: www.datzeroth.de

Datzeroth (German pronunciation: [ˈdatsəʁoːt]) is a municipality in the district of Neuwied, in Rhineland-Palatinate, Germany.
