= Straßenhaus =

- Municipality
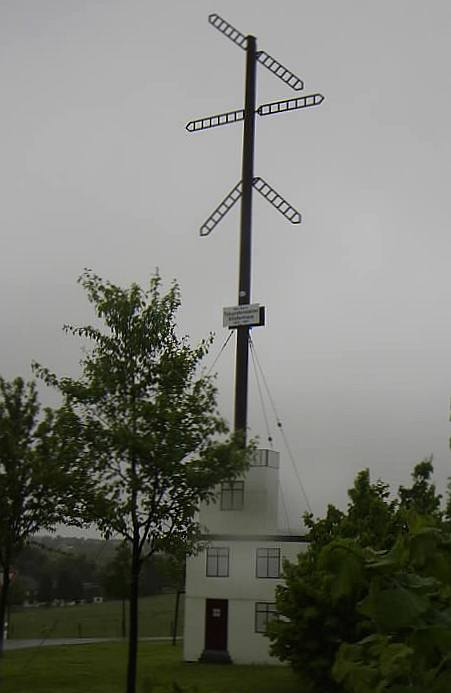

- Coat of arms

- Location of Straßenhaus within Neuwied district
- Interactive map of Straßenhaus
- Location within Germany Location within Rhineland-Palatinate
- Coordinates: 50°32′21″N 7°31′07″E
- Country: Germany
- State: Rhineland-Palatinate
- District: Neuwied
- Municipal assoc.: Rengsdorf-Waldbreitbach
- Subdivisions: 3

Government
  - Mayor (2024–29): Holger Drees

Area
  - Total: 10.17 km^{2} (3.93 sq mi)
- Elevation: 365 m (1,198 ft)

Population (2025-12-31)
  - Total: 1,995
  - Density: 196.2/km^{2} (508.1/sq mi)
- Time zone: UTC+01:00 (CET)
  - Summer (DST): UTC+02:00 (CEST)
- Postal codes: 56587
- Dialling codes: 02634
- Vehicle registration: NR
- Website: www.strassenhaus.de

Straßenhaus (German pronunciation: [ˈʃtʁaːsn̩haʊs]) is a municipality in the district of Neuwied, in Rhineland-Palatinate, Germany.

Straßenhaus lies in the Rhine-Westerwald Nature Park.
