= Oberhonnefeld-Gierend =

- Municipality
- Coat of arms

- Location of Oberhonnefeld-Gierend within Neuwied district
- Interactive map of Oberhonnefeld-Gierend
- Location within Germany Location within Rhineland-Palatinate
- Coordinates: 50°33′10″N 07°31′11″E
- Country: Germany
- State: Rhineland-Palatinate
- District: Neuwied
- Municipal assoc.: Rengsdorf-Waldbreitbach
- Subdivisions: 3

Government
  - Mayor (2019–24): Oliver Weihrauch

Area
  - Total: 3.97 km^{2} (1.53 sq mi)
- Elevation: 391 m (1,283 ft)

Population (2025-12-31)
  - Total: 1,057
  - Density: 266/km^{2} (690/sq mi)
- Time zone: UTC+01:00 (CET)
  - Summer (DST): UTC+02:00 (CEST)
- Postal codes: 56587
- Dialling codes: 02634
- Vehicle registration: NR
- Website: www.oberhonnefeld.de

Oberhonnefeld-Gierend is a municipality in the district of Neuwied, in Rhineland-Palatinate, Germany.
