= Melsbach =

- Municipality
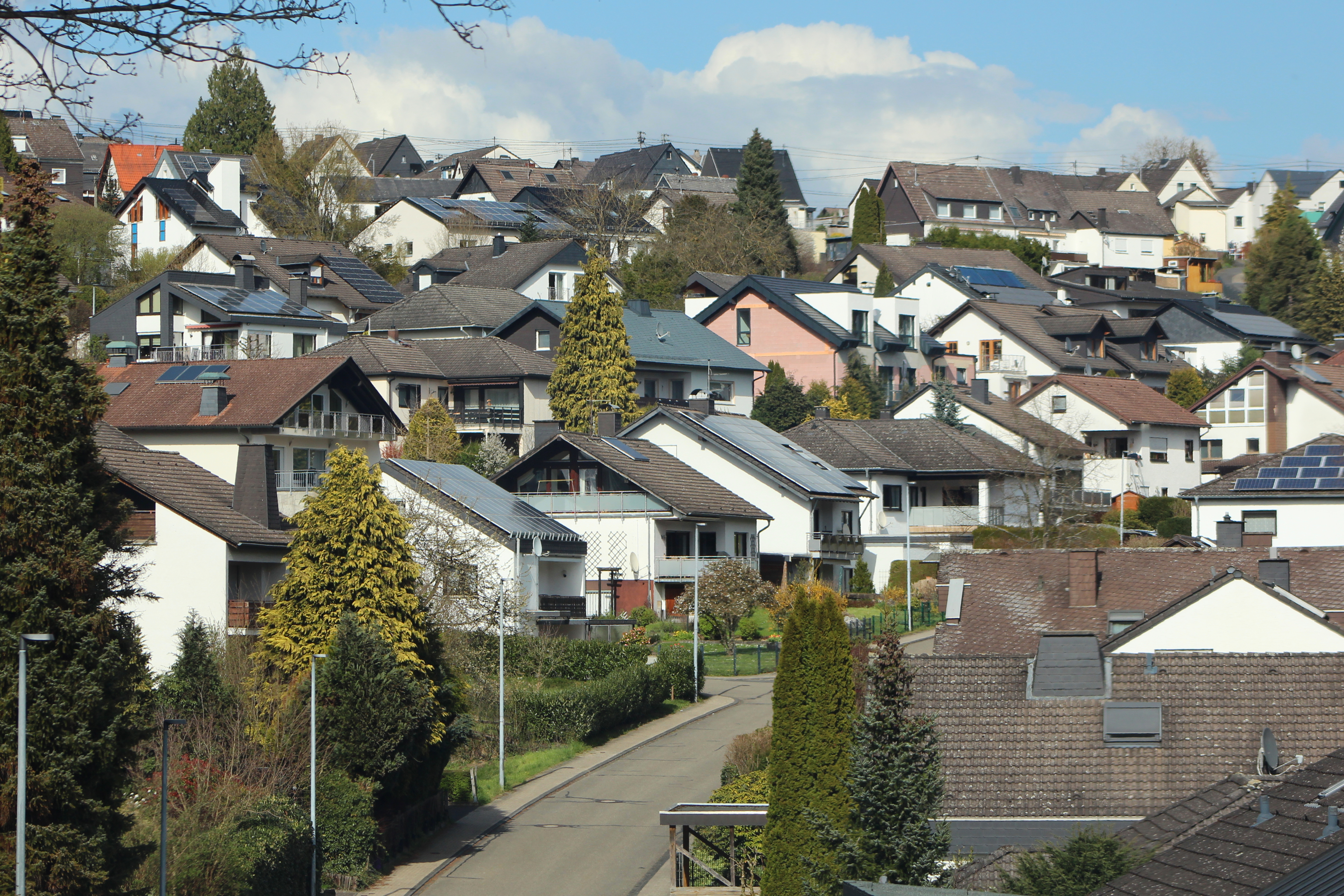

- Coat of arms

- Location of Melsbach within Neuwied district
- Interactive map of Melsbach
- Location within Germany Location within Rhineland-Palatinate
- Coordinates: 50°29′27″N 07°28′42″E
- Country: Germany
- State: Rhineland-Palatinate
- District: Neuwied
- Municipal assoc.: Rengsdorf-Waldbreitbach

Government
  - Mayor (2019–24): Holger Klein (FW)

Area
  - Total: 2.8 km^{2} (1.1 sq mi)
- Elevation: 170 m (560 ft)

Population (2025-12-31)
  - Total: 1,953
  - Density: 700/km^{2} (1,800/sq mi)
- Time zone: UTC+01:00 (CET)
  - Summer (DST): UTC+02:00 (CEST)
- Postal codes: 56581
- Dialling codes: 02634
- Vehicle registration: NR
- Website: www.gemeinde-melsbach.de

Melsbach (German pronunciation: [ˈmɛlsbax]) is a municipality in the district of Neuwied, in Rhineland-Palatinate, Germany. Since 2018, it has been part of the Verbandsgemeinde Rengsdorf-Waldbreitbach.

== Description ==
Melsbach is in the midst of thick, lush forests. It is located at the southern border of the Westerwald region and thus often described as a "border village". Nearby municipalities include: Rengsdorf, Niederbieber, Oberbieber and Altwied. The current mayor of Melsbach is Holger Klein.

== History and special events ==
The first reference to the village's name occurs in 1267 as "Melszbach" as part of a county that the earl Gottfried von Eppstein, the Younger, had to sell away. In 1396, the "Kreuzkirche" (church-of-the-cross) chapel was built and first mentioned in 1399 in curatorial documents. The chapel belonged to the St. Thomas monastery (a woman's diocese) of Andernach and it was a famous pilgrimage destination from the beginning. Today, the ruins of the Kreuzkirche reside at the southern entrance to the village and have become a tourist attraction and popular panorama motif.

In 1789, vast clay fields were found, containing both white and colored clay rich in siderite. It was also discovered that the clay contained high amounts of precious alum. The alum mining lasted until 1880; clay mining lasted until the late 1960s. Today's "soccer hill" at the south entrance of Melsbach, opposite to the Kreuzkirche, is the result of a huge scree slope. Only a winding tower marks the place where the mines' entrance once was. The tower has become a local emblem and can still be visited, though not climbed. The clay of Melsbach is described as "highly fireproof" and "of remarkable quality, often preferred for ceramic".

Despite its rich mineral resources, Melsbach was described as being "poor" in curatorial documents. In contrast to the neighbourhood municipality Altwied, Melsbach had to pay taxes. And even with the mines, Melsbach grew surprisingly slowly. Between 1753 and 1807, for example, only six new houses were built, and from 1840 and 1895, 22. In 1840, Melsbach counted 399 inhabitants; by 1895 it had 559 citizens. The increase of houses may have been the result of the mining, but oddly enough, the increase of inhabitants in neighbourhood towns, such as Niederbieber, Oberbieber and Rengsdorf was disproportionately higher. It is possible that most of the mine workers came from the surrounding towns.

The surroundings of Melsbach are of geological and archaeological interest: local investigations have led to discoveries of ammonites and plant fossils, as well as a bronze bucket from the late bronze era, dated to 500 BC. The area has also had some seismic activity. In April 1992, the citizens of Melsbach and the rest of Rhineland-Palatinate were surprised by an earthquake with the magnitude of 5,9 on the Richter scale. It occurred at 3:40 A.M. and lasted fifteen seconds. In 2011, another earthquake struck Melsbach with a magnitude of 4,8 on the Richter scale.

== Timeline ==
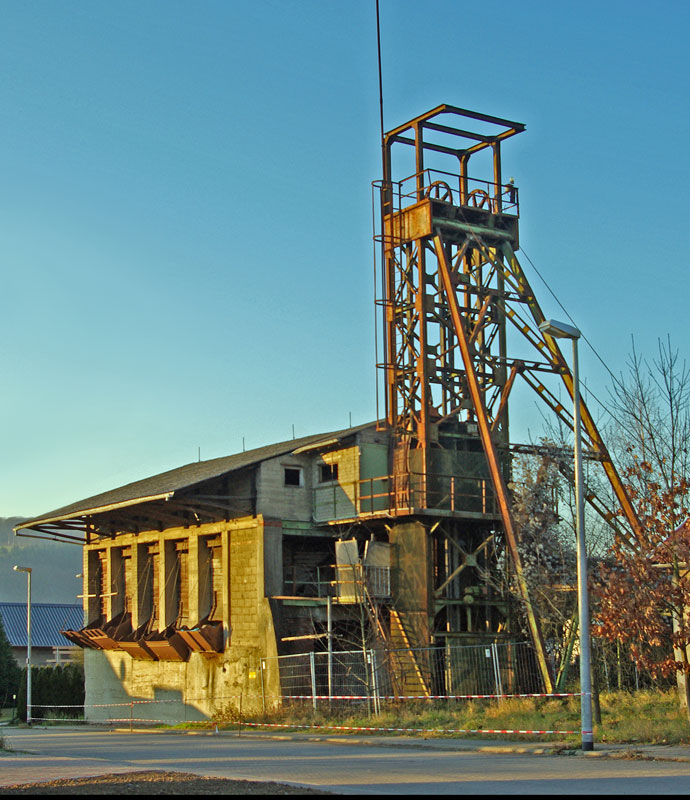
Winding tower of Melsbach

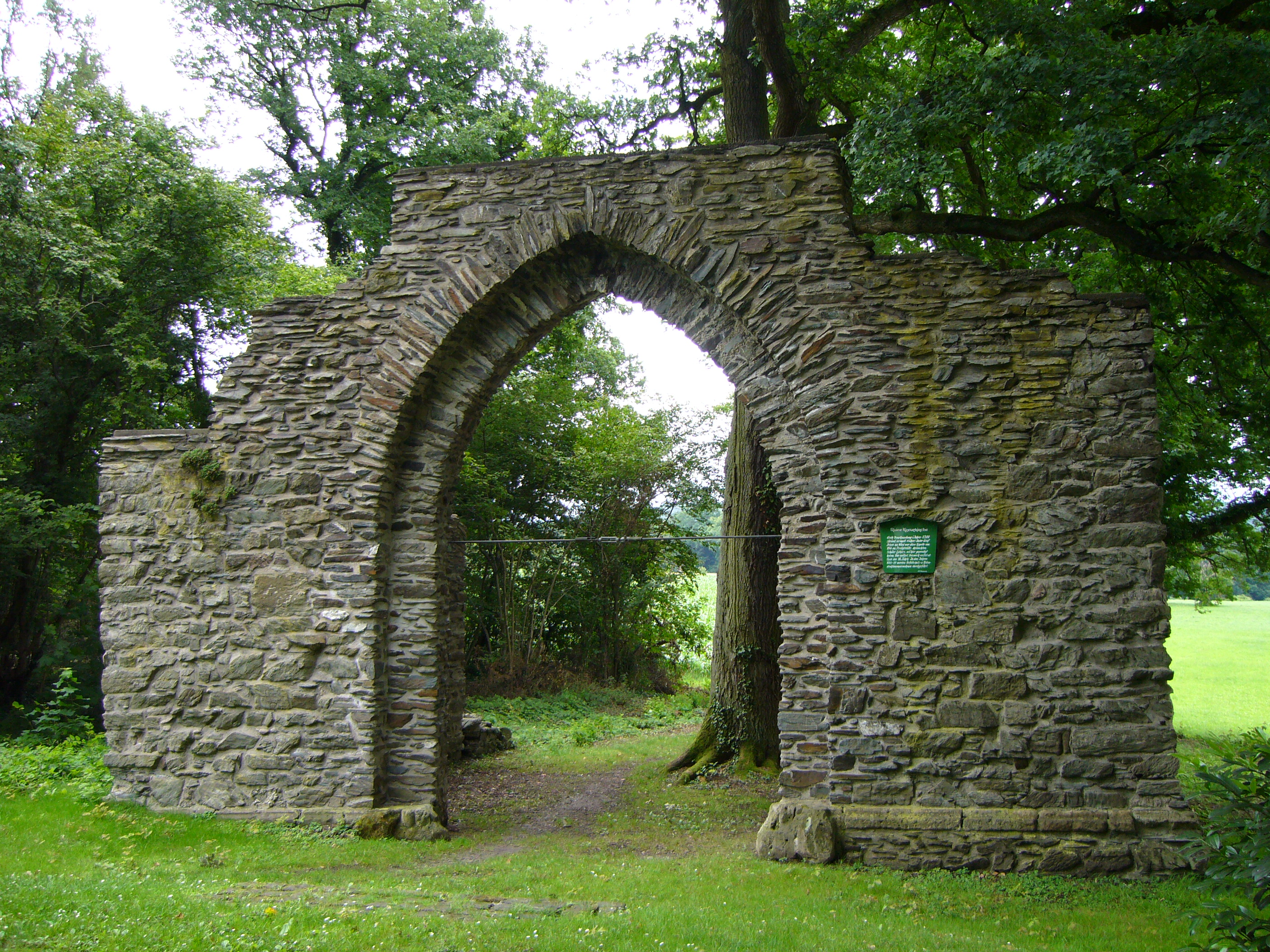
Kreuzkirche (church-of-the-cross)

- 500 BC: Date of the bronze bucket discovered by archaeologists
- 1267: First documents mentioning the village: Graf Gottfried von Eppstein, the Younger, sells his estate
- 1278: Melsbach becomes the parish of Rengsdorf
- 1357: Melsbach becomes an important customs facility
- 1399: First curatorial document entry about the Kreuzkirche (church-of-the-cross) as a pilgrimage destination
- 1692: Melsbach receives its own school
- 1747: Melsbach enparts to the parish of Altwied
- 1789: Lignite and clay deposits are found
- 1789–1880: Digging of alum in the first alum-mine of Rhineland-Palatinate
- 1812-1815: Destruction of most parts of Melsbach during the German Campaign of 1813
- 1850: At the Laubach creek blue schist is discovered
- 1863: First kermis in Melsbach, first mentioning of the regional wine "Melsbacher Goldberg"
- 1865: Foundation of the Burschenverein Melsbach
- 1907: Foundation of the Auxiliary Fire Brigade

== Population statistics ==
The following list shows the population changes from 1815 - 2014 according to the statistical office of Rhineland-Palatinate.

- 1815: 345
- 1835: 382
- 1871: 431
- 1905: 576
- 1939: 609
- 1950: 731
- 1961: 973
- 1970: 1391
- 1987: 2015
- 2005: 2017
- 2011: 1996
- 2014: 2007

== Local legends ==
A rarely known legend from 14th century tells the legend of how and why the Kreuzkirche chapel was built:

Once upon a time, the surroundings of today Melsbach's and Rengsdorf's heights were covered in thick forests. These forests were crowded with wild animals in such amounts, that wealthy knights and earls greatly enjoyed hunting in these woods. One of these knights, who originated from the valley of the Wied, was known for hunting often in the high forests.

One day, he became so eagerly involved hunting a deer, that he completely lost his orientation and any feeling for time and space. Not only did he lose sight of his comrades, when he blew the horn, he received no audible response. Unfortunately, the sun was soon setting and night approached. The knight decided to set up a camp for night under an extraordinarily thick and lush oak tree.

Suddenly he saw an ominous bright, white light between the far trees and the figure of a white, shimmering lady appeared. The white lady was holding a shining cross in her hands and told the knight, "Follow me!" The man did so and the lady guided him home safely.

Right after this event the knight became a pious believer and he ordered his servants to erect a large, beautiful cross at the spot where he had encountered the white lady. Later, when he became rich, he gave order to the erection of a chapel at the place where the cross was placed. The chapel was then named "Kreuzkirche" (church-of-the-cross).

== Sources ==
- Albert Hardt: Melsbach und seine Geschichte. In: Im Wiedischen Land, Rengsdorf 1989 – Geschichte der Orte in der Verbandsgemeinde Rengsdorf, page 377 ff.
