= Anhausen =

- Municipality
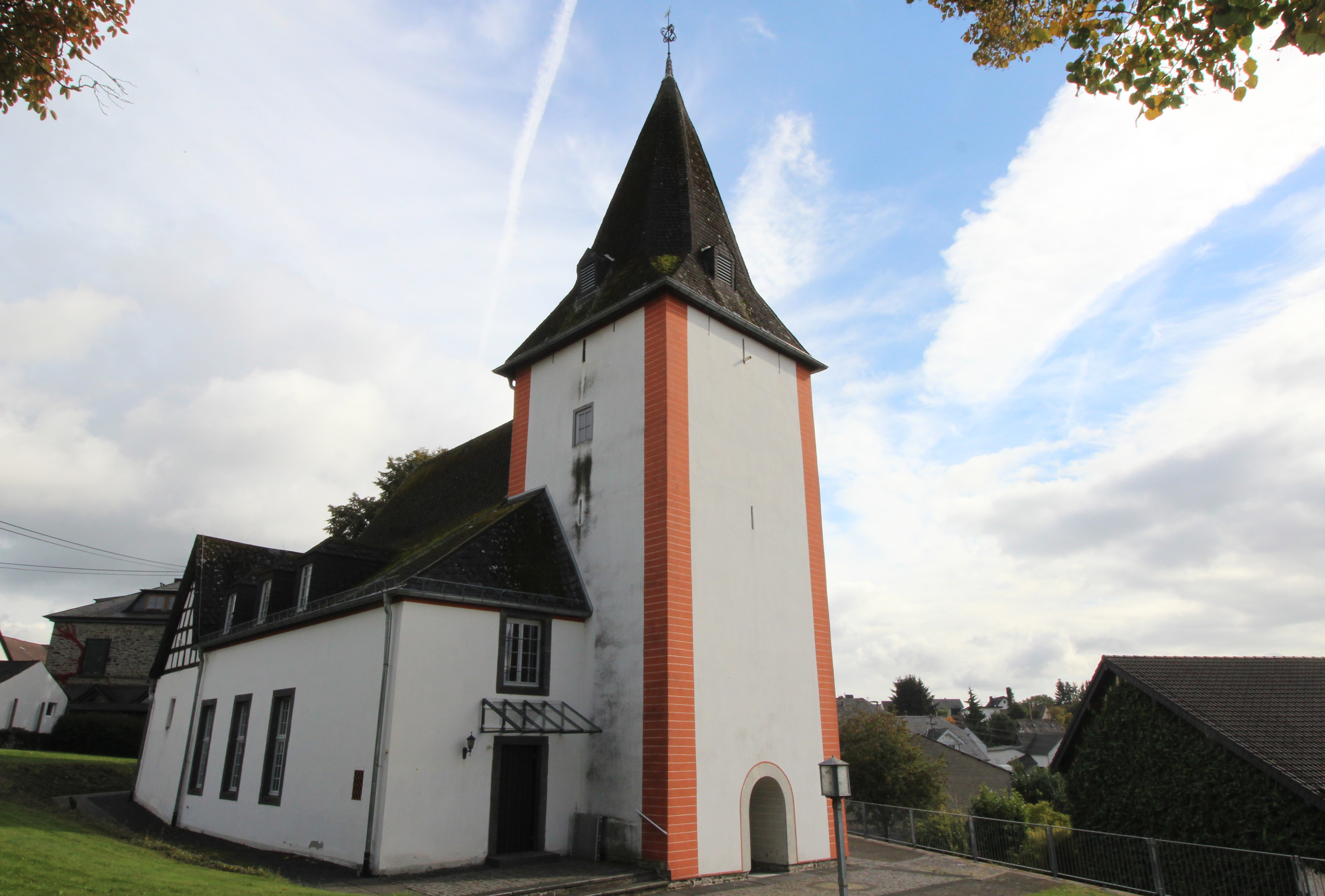

- Coat of arms

- Location of Anhausen within Neuwied district
- Interactive map of Anhausen
- Location within Germany Location within Rhineland-Palatinate
- Coordinates: 50°30′04″N 07°33′13″E
- Country: Germany
- State: Rhineland-Palatinate
- District: Neuwied
- Municipal assoc.: Rengsdorf-Waldbreitbach

Government
  - Mayor (2019–24): Heinz-Otto Zantop

Area
  - Total: 9.54 km^{2} (3.68 sq mi)
- Elevation: 310 m (1,020 ft)

Population (2025-12-31)
  - Total: 1,418
  - Density: 149/km^{2} (385/sq mi)
- Time zone: UTC+01:00 (CET)
  - Summer (DST): UTC+02:00 (CEST)
- Postal codes: 56584
- Dialling codes: 02639
- Vehicle registration: NR
- Website: www.anhausen.de

Anhausen is a municipality in the district of Neuwied, in Rhineland-Palatinate, Germany.
