= Breitscheid (Westerwald) =

- Municipality
- Coat of arms

- Location of Breitscheid within Neuwied district
- Interactive map of Breitscheid
- Location within Germany Location within Rhineland-Palatinate
- Coordinates: 50°34′52″N 7°26′45″E
- Country: Germany
- State: Rhineland-Palatinate
- District: Neuwied
- Municipal assoc.: Rengsdorf-Waldbreitbach
- Subdivisions: 13

Government
  - Mayor (2019–24): Roswitha Schulte

Area
  - Total: 12.22 km^{2} (4.72 sq mi)
- Elevation: 320 m (1,050 ft)

Population (2025-12-31)
  - Total: 2,252
  - Density: 184.3/km^{2} (477.3/sq mi)
- Time zone: UTC+01:00 (CET)
  - Summer (DST): UTC+02:00 (CEST)
- Postal codes: 53547
- Dialling codes: 02638
- Vehicle registration: NR
- Website: www.rengsdorf-waldbreitbach.de

Breitscheid (German pronunciation: [ˈbʁaɪtˌʃaɪt]) is a municipality in the district of Neuwied, in Rhineland-Palatinate, Germany.
