= Waldbreitbach =

- Municipality
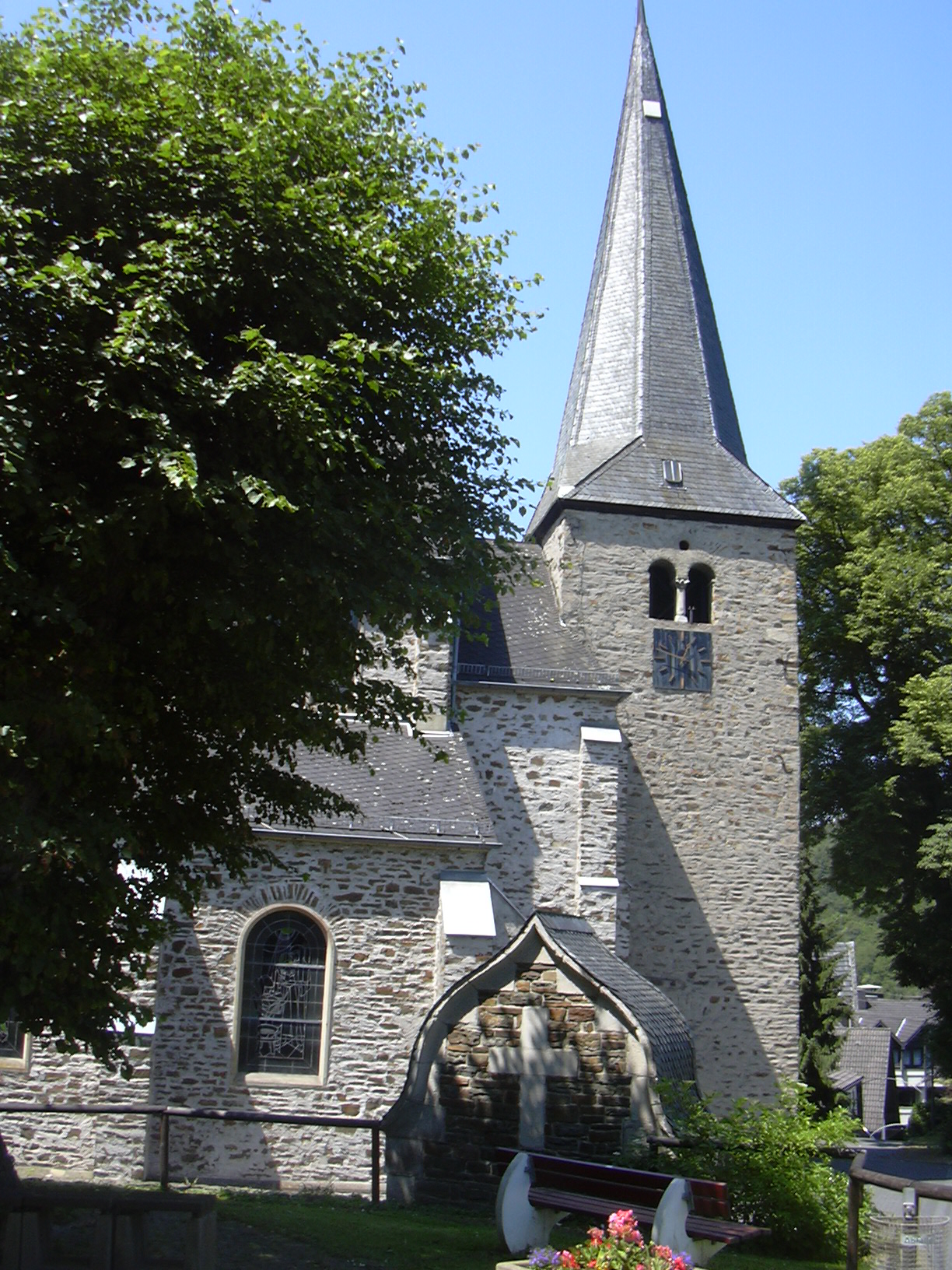

- Coat of arms

- Location of Waldbreitbach within Neuwied district
- Interactive map of Waldbreitbach
- Location within Germany Location within Rhineland-Palatinate
- Coordinates: 50°33′09″N 7°25′06″E
- Country: Germany
- State: Rhineland-Palatinate
- District: Neuwied
- Municipal assoc.: Rengsdorf-Waldbreitbach

Government
  - Mayor (2019–24): Martin Lerbs (CDU)

Area
  - Total: 6.39 km^{2} (2.47 sq mi)
- Elevation: 140 m (460 ft)

Population (2025-12-31)
  - Total: 1,924
  - Density: 301/km^{2} (780/sq mi)
- Time zone: UTC+01:00 (CET)
  - Summer (DST): UTC+02:00 (CEST)
- Postal codes: 56588
- Dialling codes: 02638
- Vehicle registration: NR
- Website: www.waldbreitbach.de

Waldbreitbach is a municipality in the district of Neuwied, in Rhineland-Palatinate, Germany. It is situated in the Westerwald, on the river Wied, approx. 16 km north of Neuwied.

Waldbreitbach was the seat of the former Verbandsgemeinde ("collective municipality") Waldbreitbach.

== History ==
The place was first mentioned in documents (spelled "Bretpah") in 857. In the following centuries the dominion over the place changed several times between Thuringia, Cologne and Sayn. Between 1806 and 1815 the village belonged to the Duchy of Nassau, then to Prussia.

== Population ==
In 1815 406 people were living in Waldbreitbach. This number increased to 2118 in 1997 and as of 2018 there were officially 1828 inhabitants.

== Waldbreitbach mill ==
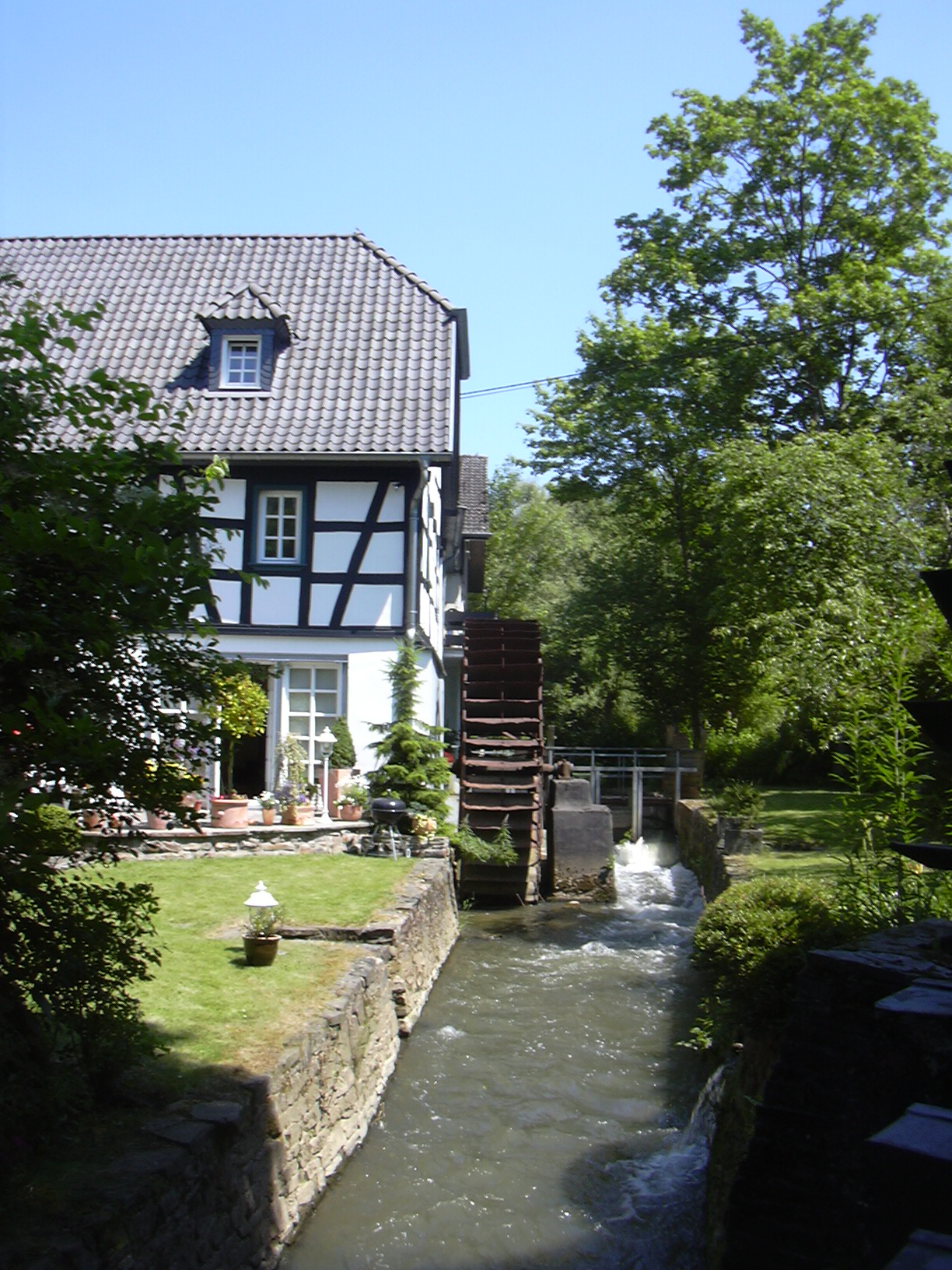
Waldbreitbach mill

On the Wied stands an oil mill, which started production in 1676. Only four years later it was destroyed by a flood. The mill was rebuilt in 1700 and was in operation until 1948. It is considered the oldest oil mill of this type in the Rhineland. In the 1990s an old half-timbered house was dismantled in nearby Bremscheid and rebuilt next to the mill as a museum of crafts and trade. About 100 meters upstream stands a mill with a water wheel from 1911.
