= Ehlscheid =

- Municipality
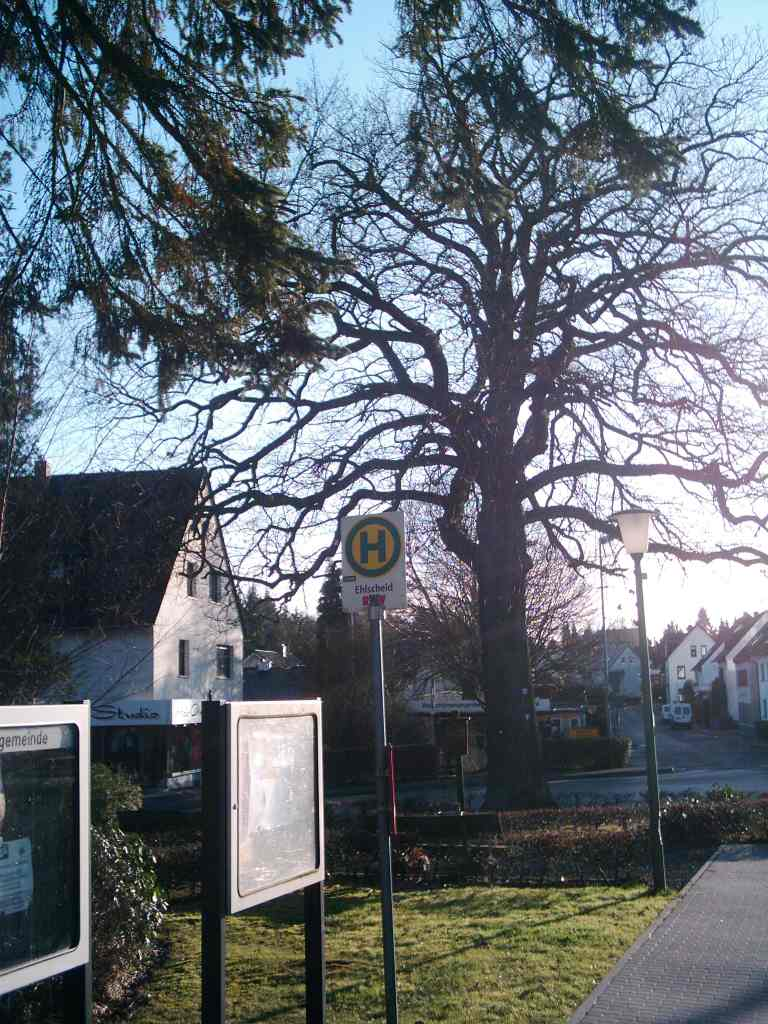

- Coat of arms

- Location of Ehlscheid within Neuwied district
- Interactive map of Ehlscheid
- Location within Germany Location within Rhineland-Palatinate
- Coordinates: 50°30′58″N 7°28′05″E
- Country: Germany
- State: Rhineland-Palatinate
- District: Neuwied
- Municipal assoc.: Rengsdorf-Waldbreitbach

Government
  - Mayor (2019–24): Ingelore Runkel

Area
  - Total: 6.27 km^{2} (2.42 sq mi)
- Elevation: 350 m (1,150 ft)

Population (2025-12-31)
  - Total: 1,544
  - Density: 246/km^{2} (638/sq mi)
- Time zone: UTC+01:00 (CET)
  - Summer (DST): UTC+02:00 (CEST)
- Postal codes: 56581
- Dialling codes: 02634
- Vehicle registration: NR
- Website: www.ehlscheid.de

Ehlscheid (German pronunciation: [ˈeːlʃaɪt]) is a municipality in the district of Neuwied, in Rhineland-Palatinate, Germany. Part of the municipality are also three Wohnplätze, namely Forsthaus Gommerscheid, Hof Talblick and Talhof. (Forsthaus may be translated as forester's lodge, Hof (in that case) as homestead).

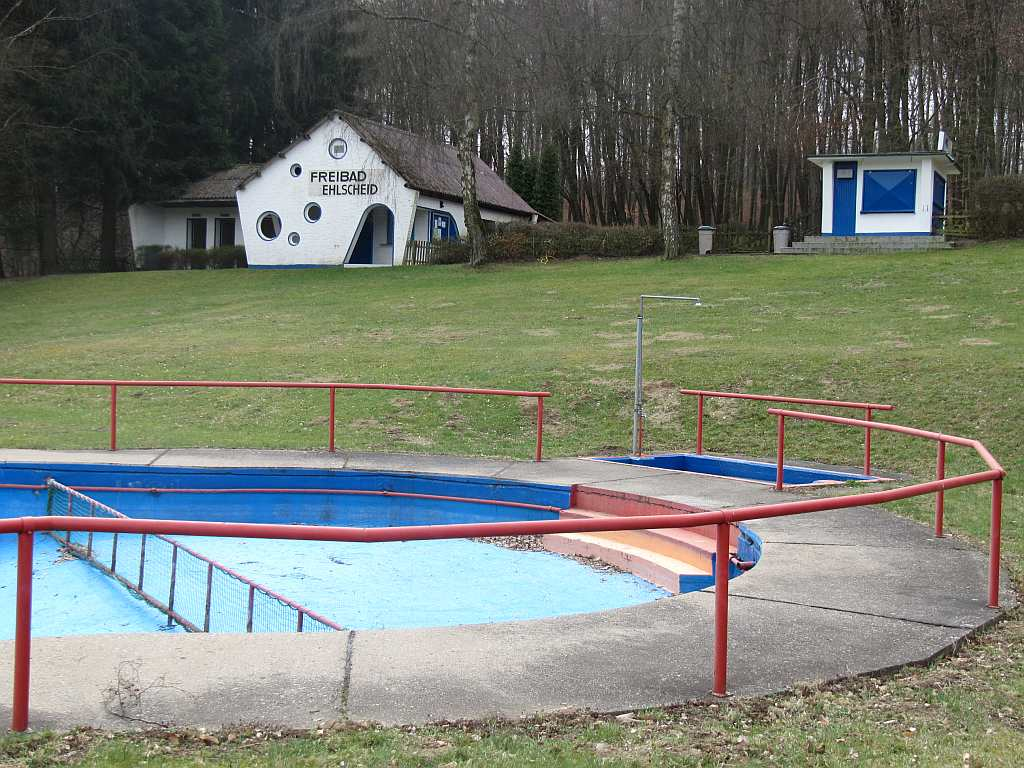
The closed bath in 2012

On 1 June 1958 an open-air bath was opened in Ehlscheid. It was closed in 2012 due to technical problems. In 2016, the pool was leveled and filled with earth.

The Rockefeller family has its roots in Ehlscheid, but also in the abandoned village of Rockenfeld and in Fahr (both today part of Neuwied).
