= Niederbreitbach =

- Municipality
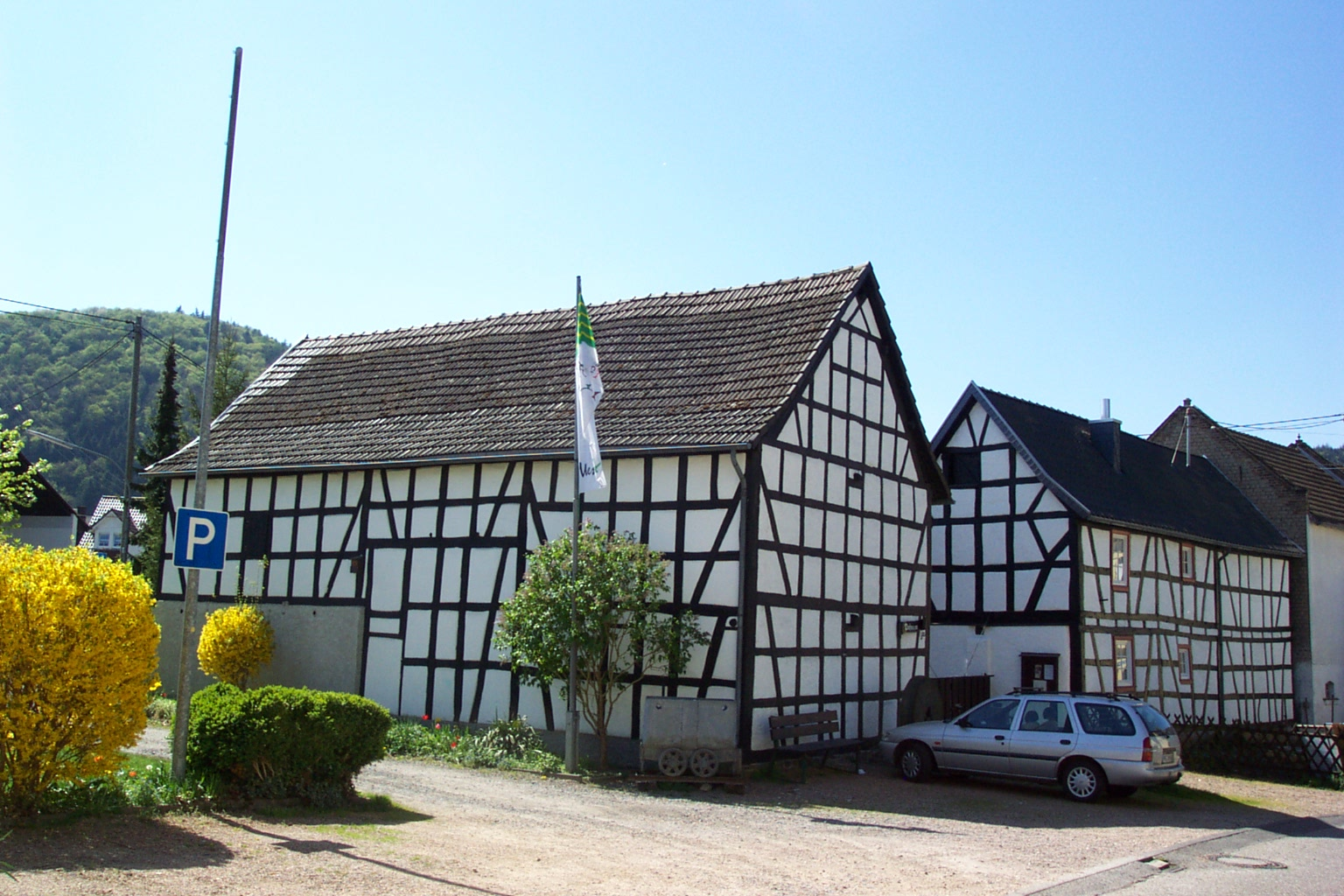
- Local history museum

- Coat of arms

- Location of Niederbreitbach within Neuwied district
- Interactive map of Niederbreitbach
- Location within Germany Location within Rhineland-Palatinate
- Coordinates: 50°31′55″N 07°25′04″E
- Country: Germany
- State: Rhineland-Palatinate
- District: Neuwied
- Municipal assoc.: Rengsdorf-Waldbreitbach
- Subdivisions: 13

Government
  - Mayor (2019–24): Susanne Hardt

Area
  - Total: 8.53 km^{2} (3.29 sq mi)
- Elevation: 120 m (390 ft)

Population (2025-12-31)
  - Total: 1,527
  - Density: 179/km^{2} (464/sq mi)
- Time zone: UTC+01:00 (CET)
  - Summer (DST): UTC+02:00 (CEST)
- Postal codes: 56589
- Dialling codes: 02638
- Vehicle registration: NR

Niederbreitbach is a municipality and officially recognised climatic health-resort in the district of Neuwied, in Rhineland-Palatinate, Germany. It belongs to Verbandsgemeinde of Rengsdorf-Waldbreitbach.
