= Karl Reinhardt (education reformer) =

German educationist (1849–1923)

- Born: Karl Paul Friedrich Reinhardt; 12 July 1849; Puderbach, Neuwied, Rhine Province, Kingdom of Prussia
- Died: 4 October 1923 (aged 74); Salem, Baden, Germany
- Education: Basel; Berlin; Bonn
- Occupations: School teacher/School director Education reformer
- Spouse: Auguste Sophie Magdalena Freudenburg (1850-1906)
- Children: Sophie; Elsbeth; Karl; Herbert
- Parents: Carl Andreas Reinhardt (1809-1857) (father); Marie Neumann (mother)

Karl Reinhardt (12 July 1849 - 4 October 1923) was a German head teacher who became a pioneering school reformer.

== Life and works ==
Karl Paul Friedrich Reinhardt was born at Puderbach, a small country town in the hills north of Koblenz. Carl Andreas Reinhardt (1809-1857) was an evangelical church minister at nearby Niederwambach who died when the child was eight. His mother, born Marie Neumann, was the daughter of another church minister. After she was widowed, and as Karl grew up, she continued to run the girls' school at Neuwied, the administrative capital of the rural district, and a short distance to the south of their home town. Through the marriage of his father's sister, Karl Reinhardt was also a nephew to Carl Johann Freudenberg, a leading businessman in the area, whose daughter he subsequently married, notwithstanding the proximity of their shared kinship.

Reinhardt completed his schooling at the "Gymnasium" (secondary school) in Weilburg and moved on to study at the universities of Basel, Bonn Berlin. In retrospect, the best known of his university-level teachers was the young tutor of classical philology at Basel, Friedrich Nietzsche, by whom some sources indicate his own scholarly outlook was significantly influenced. His student career was punctuated during 1870/71 by the Franco-Prussian War in which he participated as a volunteer medical orderly. He received his doctorate from the University of Bonn in 1873 and went on to embark on a teaching career at a secondary school in Bielefeld, a midsized city to the south of Hannover. He switched to a secondary school at Münster, a similarly sized city, some 100 km to the west of Bielefeld, two years later.

Promotion followed in 1880 when he moved again, this time to the "City Gymnasium" ("Städtische Gymnasium", as the "Lessing Gymnasium" secondary school was known before 1886). Still only 29, Reinhardt was now employed as a senior teacher ("Oberlehrer"). This turned out to be a stepping stone to further promotion, and in 1884 he moved on to Detmold, accepting a position as school director at the Prince's secondary school ("Fürstliche Gymnasium", as Detmold's oldest secondary school was commonly known till shortly after Germany became a republic). He remained in post only for two years, however.

The second half of the nineteenth century was a period of rapid population growth and urbanisation in Germany as immigrants arrived from the east and countryfolk moved to the towns and cities in order to obtain higher wages. Frankfurt was expanding rapidly. In 1886 Reinhardt returned to Frankfurt in order to take over the headship at the prestigious "City Gymnasium" in succession to Tycho Mommsen. The move coincided with a major change. Across Prussia (into which the city had been incorporated since 1866) there was vigorous discussion over possible reforms to the secondary schools system. Following his appointment, with the backing of Mayor Franz Adickes, Reinhardt worked up a detailed plan to divide the "City Gymnasium" into two separate but linked schools, one of which would continue to apply the traditional curriculum with its strongly classical leanings. The other would teach according to a reformist "Frankfurt curriculum". The most frequently discussed difference involved languages teaching. According to the Frankfurt curriculum, the first and most important foreign language taught would be French. Latin would be relegated to second place. The third foreign language taught to school students would be Greek or English. The "Frankfurt Teaching Plan" was presented in 1892. Later in 1892 the school was divided into two sections, one of which adhered to the "traditional languages model", while the other introduced the reformist model. At this stage both sections occupied the same site and were, for most purposes, administered as a single entity. Complete separation followed five years later, in 1897:

- The "Lessing Gymnasium" remained on the existing site alongside the Junghofstraße, and applied the traditional humanist curriculum.
- The "Goethe Gymnasium" was constructed on a new site a short distance away to the west, near Frankfurt's recently rebuilt "Hauptbahnhof" (main railway station). Boys (and, more recently, girls) were taught according to Reinhardt's "Frankfurt Teaching Plan". There was a powerful focus on modern languages, which outlasted the fevered populism of the early twentieth century and, nearly two centuries later. persists.

Despite being described as "twin schools", the two schools now each needed their own head teachers. Naturally Karl Reinhardt took charge, as school director, at the "Goethe Gymnasium", remaining in the post till he entered government service in 1904. In many respects the "Goethe Gymnasium" became the template on which a new generation of "reform gymnasiums" across Prussia would be modelled. The reforms pioneered at the "Goethe Gymnasium" in Frankfurt and taken up by other secondary schools were viewed with evident approval from the relevant government departments, earning Reinhardt significant kudos. In 1904 he accepted a government appointment as "Ministerial Director" and "privy counsellor" in the Prussian Culture Ministry, an appointment he continued to hold till 1919.

Reinhardt's circle of personal friends included Prince Max of Baden. After Prince Max's brief but historically critical six weeks as Chancellor of Germany, he retired to the family seat at Salem, in the hills overlooking Lake Constance. It was here that he teamed up with Karl Reinhardt and Kurt Hahn to establish an elite private boarding school, intended to prepare the sons and daughters of prominent German families to lead the German republic through the post war decades. English language sources understandably stress the extent to which the school was inspired by England's so-called "public schools" (elite boarding schools), but the Salem curriculum was closely modelled not on English traditionalism but on Reinhardt's "Frankfurt curriculum". It is believed to have been Reinhardt who had put the idea of transforming the centre block and the left wing of "Castle Salem" into a boarding school in the first place, and it was Reinhardt who was appointed, in 1920, as the institution's first school director (head). He succeeded in inculcating the same enduring spirit of internationalism in the school that he had engendered at the "Goethe Gymnasium" a quarter century earlier.

Karl Reinhardt died at Salem on 4 October 1923, three and a half years after the school had opened to pupils. He was succeeded by his friend Karl Hahn. The two men had shared a passion for school reform, driven by an appreciation of the long-stending deficiencies in the Prussian schools system. Reinhard was more than forty years older than Hahn, and brought to his reformist convictions many decades of hands-on teaching experience and of effective work in Frankfurt as a transformative school director. His approach was very much more curriculum-oriented than Hahn's. Hahn, however, was as formidably gifted intellectually as his predecessor. He had spent several years as a young man in England: after he took over from Reinhardt as school director at Salem and the ideas he had picked up and developed during his time in England were reflected in his respect for and application of the old Anglo-Saxon mantra about the importance of schooling as a "character-building" device.

== Family ==
Carl Reinhardt married Auguste Freudenberg (1850-1906) on 23 May 1877. The bride was a daughter of the leading entrepreneur Carl Johann Freudenberg (1819-1898). The marriage was followed by the births of the couple's (at least) four children.

- Karl Reinhardt (1886-1958) who became a noted philologist
- Elsbeth Reinhardt, who in 1905 married the university professor Paul Jensen
- Sophie Reinhardt, who in 1913 married the Karl Hildebrandt
- Herbert Reinhardt who became a businessman
