= Westerwald Club =

- Westerwald-Verein e. V.
- Abbreviation: WWV
- Formation: 6 May 1888, in Selters (Westerwald)
- Purpose: Promotion of hiking and tourism; management of the hiking network and refuge huts; monument protection; local history; environmental and landscape protection; youth work; marketing.
- Headquarters: Montabaur
- Members: 7,000
- Chairman: Achim Schwickert
- Website: http://www.westerwaldverein.de/

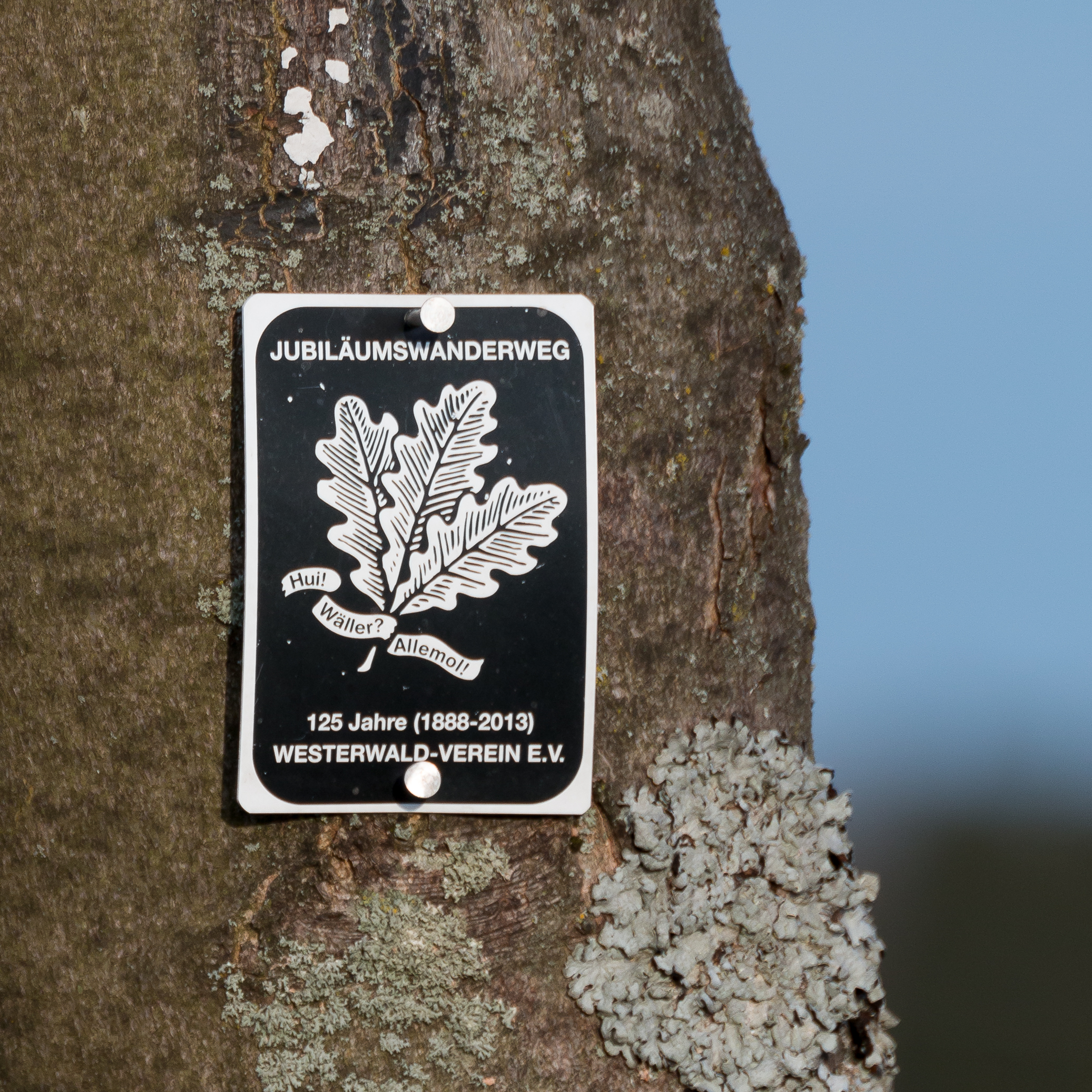
Placard on the Jubilee Trail, managed by the club, near Höhn

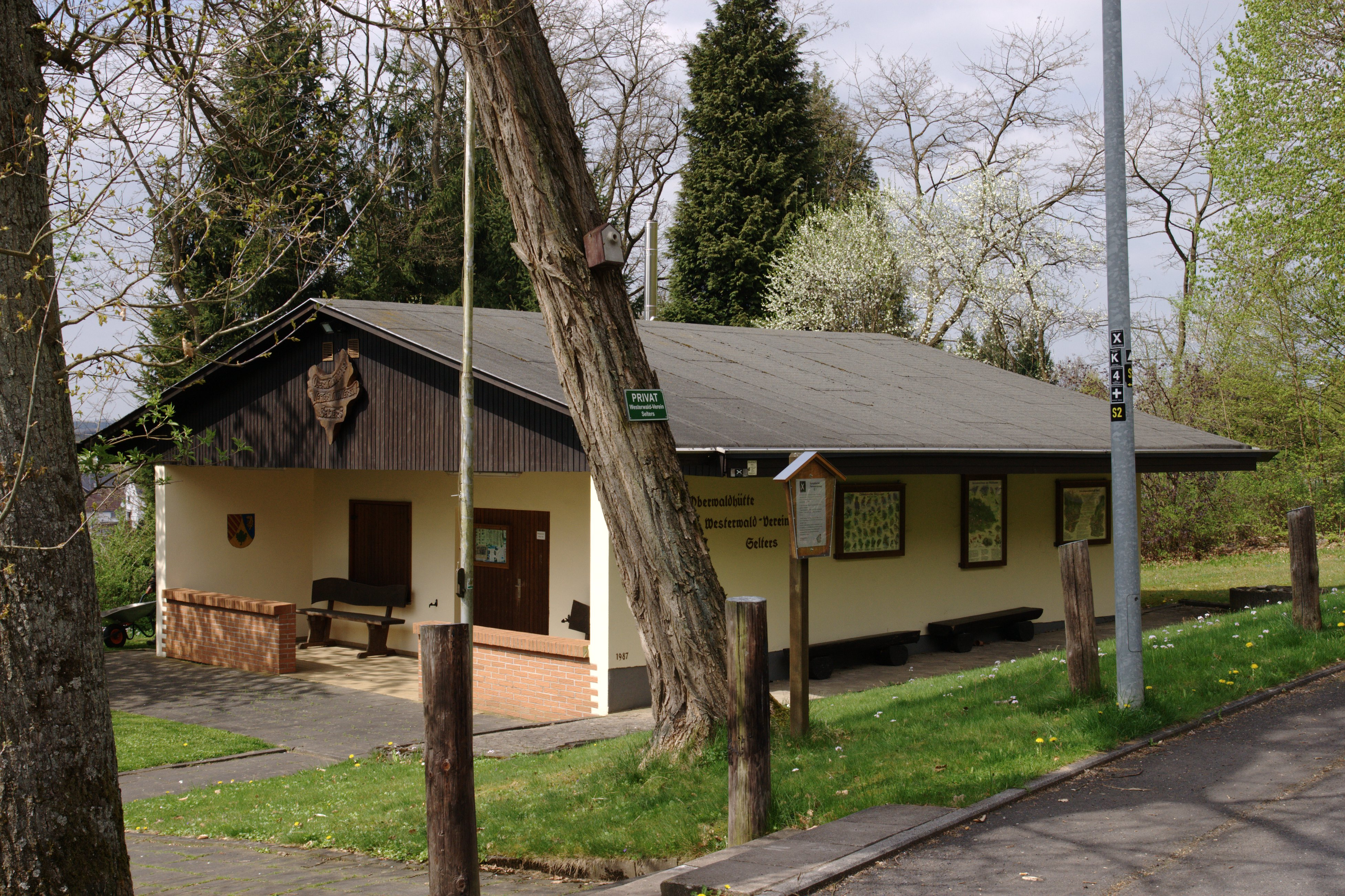
The Oberwald Hut, managed by the club, in Selters

The Westerwald Club (German: Westerwald-Verein) (WWV) was founded in 1888 in Selters in the German mountain range of Westerwald and has about 7,000 members in 40 branches. It acts as a local history society for the whole geographical region of the Westerwald. The main club supports and coordinates the activities of its branches and takes responsibility for wider tasks. It is entered in the club register of the Amtsgericht of Montabaur (VR 485). Its branches support the aims of the main club at local level through largely independent initiatives and events.

The motto of the Westerwald Club is "Hui! Wäller? - Allemol!" This slogan was chosen in a 1913 prize competition from over 60 entries. The winner was local poet and farmer, Adolf Weiß (1861–1938) from Mademühlen.

The meaning of the greeting was explained in his poem: Das Hui hat mich der Sturmwind gelehrt, wenn wild er über die Heide fährt, und „Wäller“ wir ja „allemol“ sind, wir trotzen dem Regen, dem Schnee und dem Wind ...

The Westerwald Club is a member of the Associations of German Alpine and Hiking Clubs and supports hiking and tourism. The main club offers multi-day walks through the Westerwald, as well as hiking holidays abroad. The branches organise regular walks and excursions.

The club waymarks and manages a hiking trail network over 2,300 km long, including the Druidensteig, the Limes Trail and the Westerwald Trail. Many branches maintain their local footpaths. The branches in Aßlar, Herborn and Wetzlar-Niedergirmes also have their own walking hostels, in which hikers may stay overnight at low cost. Walking hostels without accommodation are run by the branches in Blasbach, Dillenburg, Selters and Wißmar.

== Branches ==
- Aßlar
- Bad Ems (Taunus Club)
- Bad Marienberg
- Blasbach
- Buchholz (Westerwald)
- Daaden
- Daubach (Westerwald)
- Dierdorf
- Dillenburg
- Eitelborn
- Flammersfeld
- Fluterschen
- Hachenburg
- TV Hangelar (St. Augustin)
- Helmeroth
- Herborn
- Herdorf
- Herschbach
- Hillscheid
- Höhn
- Höhr-Grenzhausen
- Horbach (Westerwald) (Buchfinkenland)
- Koblenz
- Köln
- Limburg-Dornburg
- Montabaur
- Neuwied
- Nistertal
- Rennerod
- Selters (Westerwald)
- Steimel
- Unnau
- Urbach (Westerwald)
- Waldernbach
- Wallmerod
- Weilburg
- Westerburg
- Wetzlar-Niedergirmes
- Windhagen
- Wißmar

== Awards ==
The following branches of the Westerwald Club have been awarded the Eichendorff-Plakette:

- 2010 Zweigverein Daaden
