= Döttesfeld =

- Municipality
- Coat of arms

- Location of Döttesfeld within Neuwied district
- Interactive map of Döttesfeld
- Location within Germany Location within Rhineland-Palatinate
- Coordinates: 50°37′30″N 7°33′00″E
- Country: Germany
- State: Rhineland-Palatinate
- District: Neuwied
- Municipal assoc.: Puderbach

Government
  - Mayor (2019–24): Martin Fischbach

Area
  - Total: 5.84 km^{2} (2.25 sq mi)
- Elevation: 226 m (741 ft)

Population (2025-12-31)
  - Total: 672
  - Density: 115/km^{2} (298/sq mi)
- Time zone: UTC+01:00 (CET)
  - Summer (DST): UTC+02:00 (CEST)
- Postal codes: 56305
- Dialling codes: 02685
- Vehicle registration: NR
- Website: www.puderbach.de

Döttesfeld (German pronunciation: [ˈdœtəsfɛlt]) is a municipality located in the Neuwied district of Rhineland-Palatinate, Germany. The Community belongs to the Verbandsgemeinde Puderbach, which has its seat in the municipality of Puderbach. Döttesfeld has a state-recognized health resort.

== Geography ==
The community lies in Westerwald, in the valley of Wied in the nature park Rhine-Westerwald. The municipal area is surrounded on three sides by the Altenkirchen district. Neighboring municipalities are Oberlahr in the west, Eichen in the northwest, Pleckhausen and Dürrholz in the south.

== History ==
Döttesfeld was created on 7 June 1969 through the merger of the municipalities Döttesfeld, Bauscheid and Oberähren.

=== Population ===
Based on censuses, the development of Döttesfeld's population relative to today's municipal area ranges from 1871 to 1987.

Year - Population: 1815 - 233, 1835 - 247, 1871 - 310, 1905 - 382, 1939 - 390, 1950 - 439, 1961 - 445,1970 - 493, 1987 - 527, 2005 - 684.

== Municipal Council ==
The Council Döttesfeld is made up of 12 Council members who were elected at the municipal election held on 25 May 2014. The chairman serves as honorary Mayor, lately Martin Fischbach.

== Coat of arms ==
The coat of arms of Döttesfeld Blazon features a curly blue spike with four 1:2:1 set silver edge cubes, a front of silver and red, and a blue peacock facing to the left. The back of the coat of arms features a silver and green Linden tree. The peacock on the sloping pitch is taken from the coat of arms of the counts of Wied who owned Döttesfeld until 1806, while red and silver are the primary colors of Isenburg-Grenzau, where Döttesfeld was originally located. Court Linden points to the former center of the district of Panday. The four dice symbolize the four constituent cities, including Döttesfeld, Bauscheid, Oberähren and Breitscheid. The coat of arms has been legally valid since 26 January 1971, and was designed by Ernst Zeller, Raubach.

== Transport ==
Near to the centre runs Bundesstraße 256, leading from Neuwied to Altenkirchen.

The nearest Autobahn interchange is Neuwied on the 3. The nearest railway station is at Montabaur on the Cologne-Frankfurt high-speed rail line.
