= Steimle =

Steimle is a German surname. Notable people with the surname include:

- Eugen Steimle (1909–1987), German Nazi war criminal
- Jannik Steimle (born 1996), German cyclist
- Uwe Steimle, German standup comic

== See also ==
- Steimel
