= Paul Deussen =

German Indologist and philosopher (1845–1919)

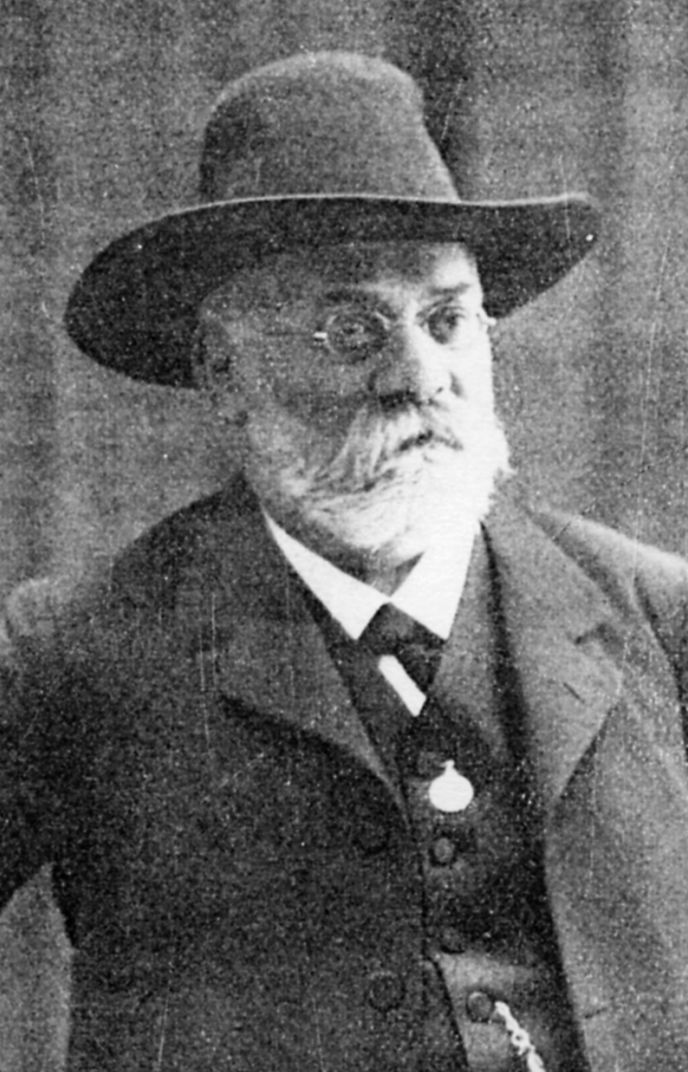
- Paul Deussen, circa 1914
- Born: 7 January 1845; Oberdreis, Rhine Province, Kingdom of Prussia
- Died: 6 July 1919 (aged 74); Kiel, Weimar Germany

Paul Jakob Deussen (German: [ˈpaʊl ˈjaːkɔp ˈdɔʏsn̩]; 7 January 1845 – 6 July 1919) was a German Indologist and professor of philosophy at University of Kiel. Strongly influenced by Arthur Schopenhauer, Deussen was a friend of Friedrich Nietzsche and Swami Vivekananda. In 1911, he founded the Schopenhauer Society (Schopenhauer-Gesellschaft). Professor Deussen was the first editor, in 1912, of the scholarly journal Schopenhauer Yearbook (Schopenhauer-Jahrbuch).

Deussen, who Sanskritised his name to "Deva-Sena" as a mark of his admiration for the language, is one of the distinguished roll of Europeans who — often with lyrical admiration — participated in the scholarly Western discovery of Sanskrit and Hinduism that took place in British India itself, Germany, France and England.

== Biography ==
Paul Deussen was born on 7 January 1845 in Oberdreis, Neuwied in the Rhine Province, one of eight children of a Reformed pastor of modest means.

Deussen attended Schulpforta from 1859 to 1864, where he befriended Friedrich Nietzsche. He subsequently studied at the universities of Bonn, Tübingen, and Berlin between 1864 and 1869, earning his doctorate at the University of Marburg in 1869 with a dissertation on Plato's Sophist. He became a lifelong adherent of the philosophies of Immanuel Kant and Arthur Schopenhauer, whose work Nietzsche recommended to him in 1868. Eduard Zeller supervised Deussen's Berlin habilitation in 1881.

Deussen was appointed Privatdocent (1881–87) and Extraordinarius (1887–89) at the university of Berlin, and Ordinarius (1889–1919, the year of his death), at the University of Kiel. Until 1919, Deussen continued to edit the Schopenhauer Yearbook, as well as working on an edition of Schopenhauer's works.

It was when he attended a lecture at the University of Bonn by Professor Christian Lassen, expounding the Shakuntala, that Deussen was fired by Sanskrit and Hinduism. Deussen's first publication (1877) was published in English as The Elements of Metaphysics in 1894. It was followed by the translations of The Sutra of the Vedanta in 1906; The Philosophy of the Upanishads also in 1906; and The System of the Vedanta in 1912. His visit to India in 1904 was published in English as My Indian Reminiscences in 1912. His autobiography, Mein Leben, edited by his daughter Erika Rosenthal-Deussen, was published posthumously in German in 1922.

== Scholarship ==
Deussen's System of the Vedanta has been reprinted several times: he uses the Brahmasutra and – rather less — Adi Shankara's commentary on it, as the structure for his exposition.

His scholarship has been described as immense, perceptive, and meticulous. Mahinder Gulati refers to him as an Orientalist and Sanskrit scholar. Natalia Isaeva called him an "outstanding scholar", while George Feuerstein called him a "great scholar" who spearheaded study of the Upanishads and Vedic literature, and Walter Kaelber referred to him as a "critical scholar."

Paul Deussen's name is thus linked with George Boucher, Sir William Jones and Sir John Woodroffe in British India, Anquetil-Duperron and Eugène Burnouf in France, Heinrich Roth, Franz Bopp, Friedrich von Schlegel and Max Müller in Germany, in the European revelation of the wealth of Hinduism as revealed by Sanskrit documents.

== Works ==
- Die Elemente der Metaphysik (1877) - "nebst einer Vorbetrachtung über das Wesen des Idealismus" - 6. Auflage (1919)
- Das System des Vedânta. Nach den Brahma-Sûtra's des Bâdarâyana und dem Commentare des Çankara über dieselben als ein Compendium der Dogmatik des Brahmanismus vom Standpunkte des Çankara aus (1883)
- Die Sûtra's des Vedânta oder die Çariraka-Mimansa des Badarayana nebst einem vollständigen Kommentare des Çankara. Aus dem Sanskrit übersetzt (1887)
- Allgemeine Geschichte der Philosophie unter besonderer Berücksichtigung der Religionen (1894ff.):
  - Band I, Teil 1: Allgemeine Einleitung und Philosophie des Veda bis auf die Upanishad's (1894)
  - Band I, Teil 2: Die Philosophie der Upanishad's (1898)
  - Band I, Teil 3: Die nachvedische Philosophie der Inder (1908)
  - Band II, Teil 1: Die Philosophie der Griechen (1911)
  - Band II, Teil 2,1: Die Philosophie der Bibel (1913)
  - Band II, Teil 2,2: Die Philosophie des Mittelalters (1915)
  - Band II, Teil 3: Die neuere Philosophie von Descartes bis Schopenhauer (1917)
- Sechzig Upanishad's des Veda (1897)
- Erinnerungen an Friedrich Nietzsche (1901)
- Erinnerungen an Indien (1904)
- Vedânta und Platonismus im Lichte der Kantischen Philosophie (1904)
- Outlines of Indian philosophy, with an appendix: On the philosophy of the Vedânta in its relations to Occidental metaphysics (1907)
- Vedânta, Platon und Kant (1917)
- Mein Leben (1922)
