= Niederhofen =

- Municipality
- Coat of arms

- Location of Niederhofen within Neuwied district
- Interactive map of Niederhofen
- Location within Germany Location within Rhineland-Palatinate
- Coordinates: 50°33′39″N 07°36′20″E
- Country: Germany
- State: Rhineland-Palatinate
- District: Neuwied
- Municipal assoc.: Puderbach

Government
  - Mayor (2019–24): Jürgen Kuhlmann

Area
  - Total: 1.38 km^{2} (0.53 sq mi)
- Elevation: 263 m (863 ft)

Population (2025-12-31)
  - Total: 476
  - Density: 345/km^{2} (893/sq mi)
- Time zone: UTC+01:00 (CET)
  - Summer (DST): UTC+02:00 (CEST)
- Postal codes: 56316
- Dialling codes: 02684
- Vehicle registration: NR
- Website: www.niederhofen.de

Niederhofen is a municipality in the district of Neuwied, in Rhineland-Palatinate, Germany.
