= Woldert =

- Municipality
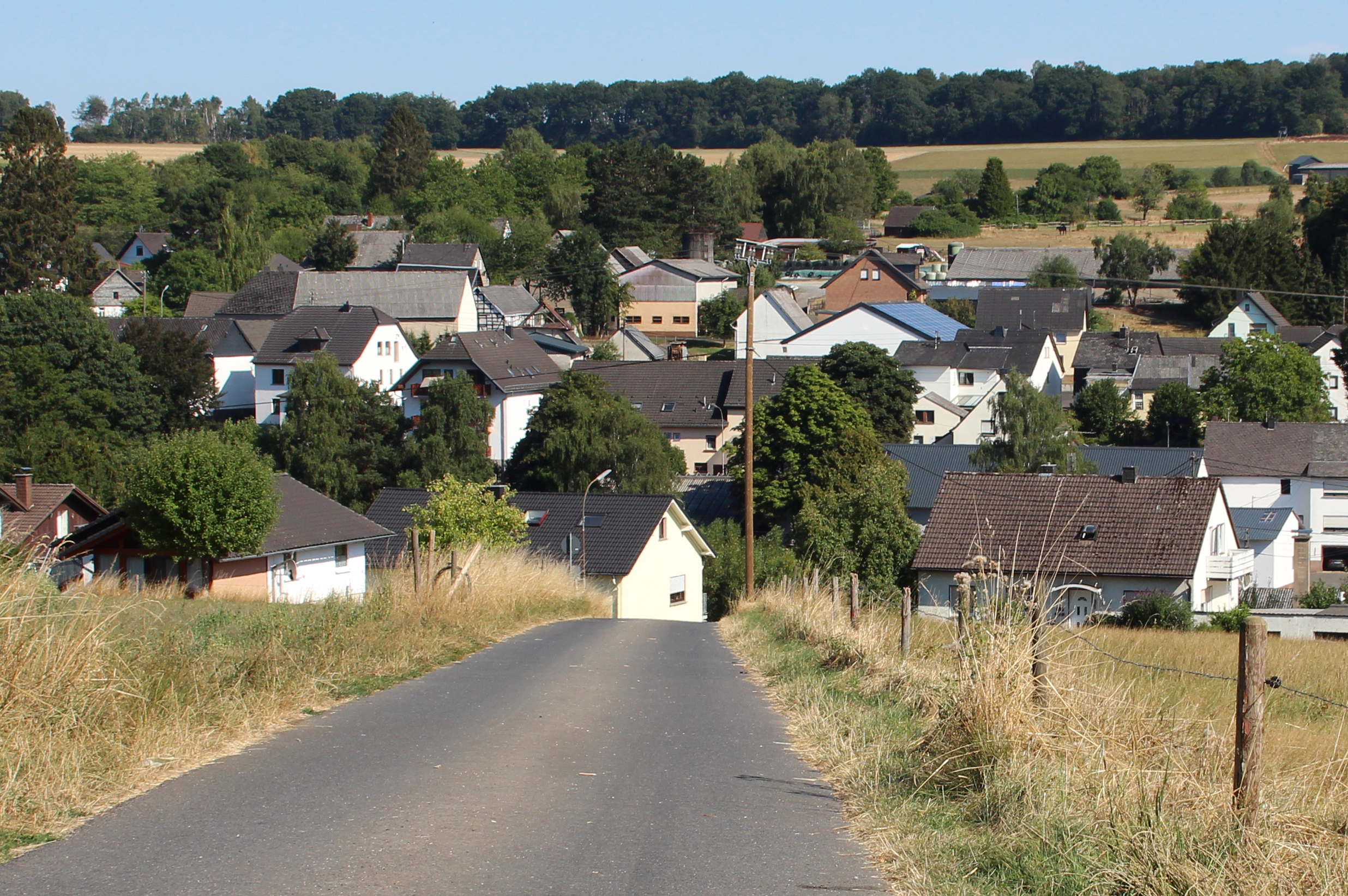

- Coat of arms

- Location of Woldert within Neuwied district
- Interactive map of Woldert
- Location within Germany Location within Rhineland-Palatinate
- Coordinates: 50°36′10″N 7°38′53″E
- Country: Germany
- State: Rhineland-Palatinate
- District: Neuwied
- Municipal assoc.: Puderbach
- Subdivisions: 2

Government
  - Mayor (2019–24): Volker Otto

Area
  - Total: 5.03 km^{2} (1.94 sq mi)
- Elevation: 255 m (837 ft)

Population (2025-12-31)
  - Total: 542
  - Density: 108/km^{2} (279/sq mi)
- Time zone: UTC+01:00 (CET)
  - Summer (DST): UTC+02:00 (CEST)
- Postal codes: 57614
- Dialling codes: 02684
- Vehicle registration: NR
- Website: www.woldert.info

Woldert is a municipality in the district of Neuwied, in Rhineland-Palatinate, Germany.
