= Altenkirchen (Westerw) station =

Railway station in Germany

Altenkirchen (Westerw)
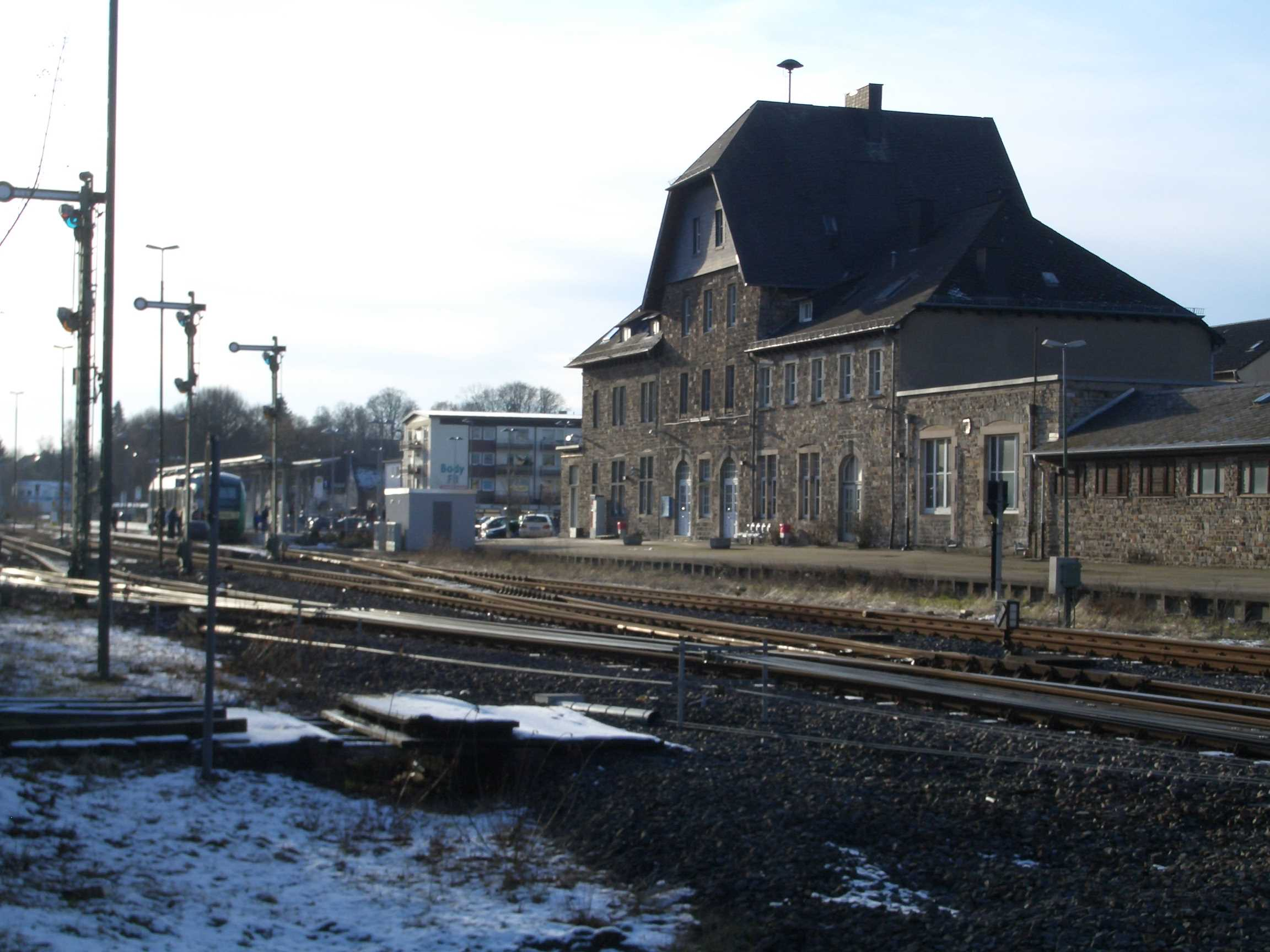
- Altenkirchen station before its modernisation (2008)

General information
- Location: Bahnhofstr. 1, Altenkirchen, Rhineland-Palatinate; Germany
- Coordinates: 50°41′06″N 7°38′21″E
- Lines: Limburg–Altenkirchen (km 65.1) (KBS 461); Engers–Au (km 61.1) (KBS 421, 423)
- Platforms: 2

Construction
- Accessible: Yes

Other information
- Station code: 105
- DS100 code: KAK
- IBNR: 8000351
- Category: 6
- Fare zone: VRM: 910; VRS: 2961 (VRM transitional tariff)
- Website: www.bahnhof.de

History
- Opened: 1 April 1885

Services
Preceding station	Hessische Landesbahn	Following station
Obererbach (Westerw) towards Siegen Hbf	RB 90	Ingelbach towards Limburg (Lahn)
Location

Altenkirchen (Westerw) station is the station of the district town of Altenkirchen in the German state of Rhineland-Palatinate. It is at track-kilometre 65.1 on the Limburg–Altenkirchen railway (also known as the Oberwesterwaldbahn—Upper Westerwald Railway) and at track-km 61.1 on the Engers–Au railway, also known as the Holzbachtalbahn (Holzbach Valley Railway).

== History ==
Altenkirchen (Westerwald) station was opened on 1 April 1885 with the Altenkirchen–Hachenburg section of the Upper Westerwald Railway. It became a junction station with the opening of the Siershahn–Altenkirchen railway in 1887. When the Altenkirchen–Au (Sieg) railway was opened on 1 May of the same year, Altenkirchen station became a transport hub for the Vorderwesterwald (the "forward" Westerwald—meaning close to the Rhine).

After the Second World War, Uerdingen railbuses operated on the line from Engers via Siershahn and Altenkirchen to Au (Sieg). Steam locomotives ran regularly on the line until 1975.

Passenger operations on the Holzbach Valley Railway ceased on 2 June 1984. Freight is still being handled in Altenkirchen.

On 23 May 1993, the line between Au and Altenkirchen was converted to a simplified form of signalling and train control known as Zugleitbetrieb and at the same time local rail services operated over the whole line from Au via Altenkirchen to Limburg.

With the takeover of operations by Vectus Verkehrsgesellschaft on 12 December 2004, the class 628 diesel multiple units, which had operated since 1986, were replaced by modern LINT DMUs and the request stops between Altenkirchen and Au became regular stops again.

== Entrance building ==
The Altenkirchen entrance building is a stately building made of crushed stone. It was built around 1883/84. The station is located at Bahnhofstraße 1. The reception building is protected as a cultural monument under the Rhineland Palatinate Monument Protection Act (Denkmalschutzgesetz).

== Station tracks ==
Altenkirchen station has a total of four tracks, two of which are platform tracks. Hessische Landesbahn trains run from platform 1 towards Limburg via Hachenburg and Westerburg. Platform 2 serves trains to Siegen Hbf via Au (Sieg), Wissen and Betzdorf.

The two platform-free tracks are used by Hessische Landesbahn to store rolling stock.

== Operations ==
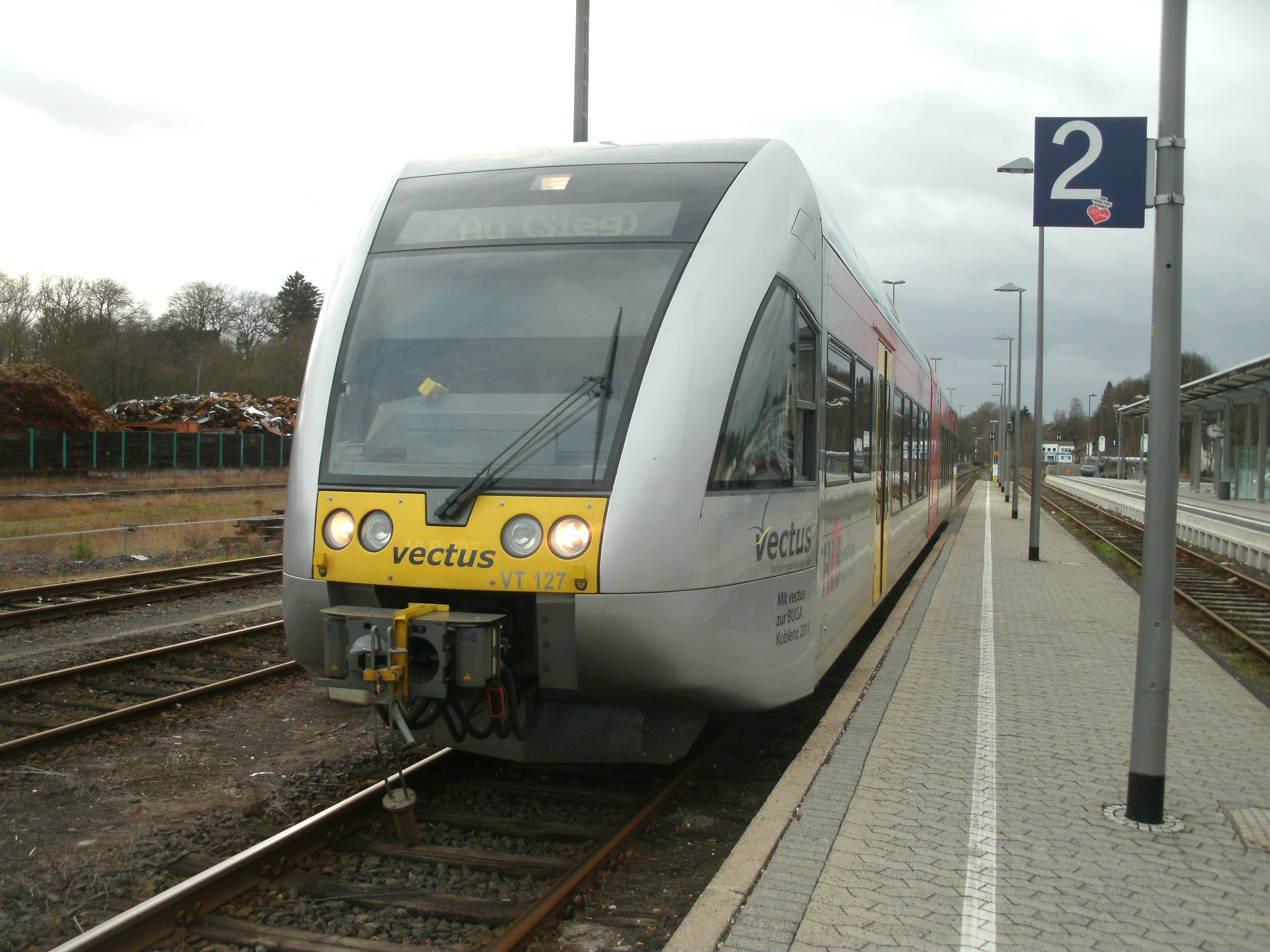
A diesel multiple unit of vectus Verkehrsgesellschaft on platform 2 in Altenkirchen station on the way to Au (Sieg) (2011)

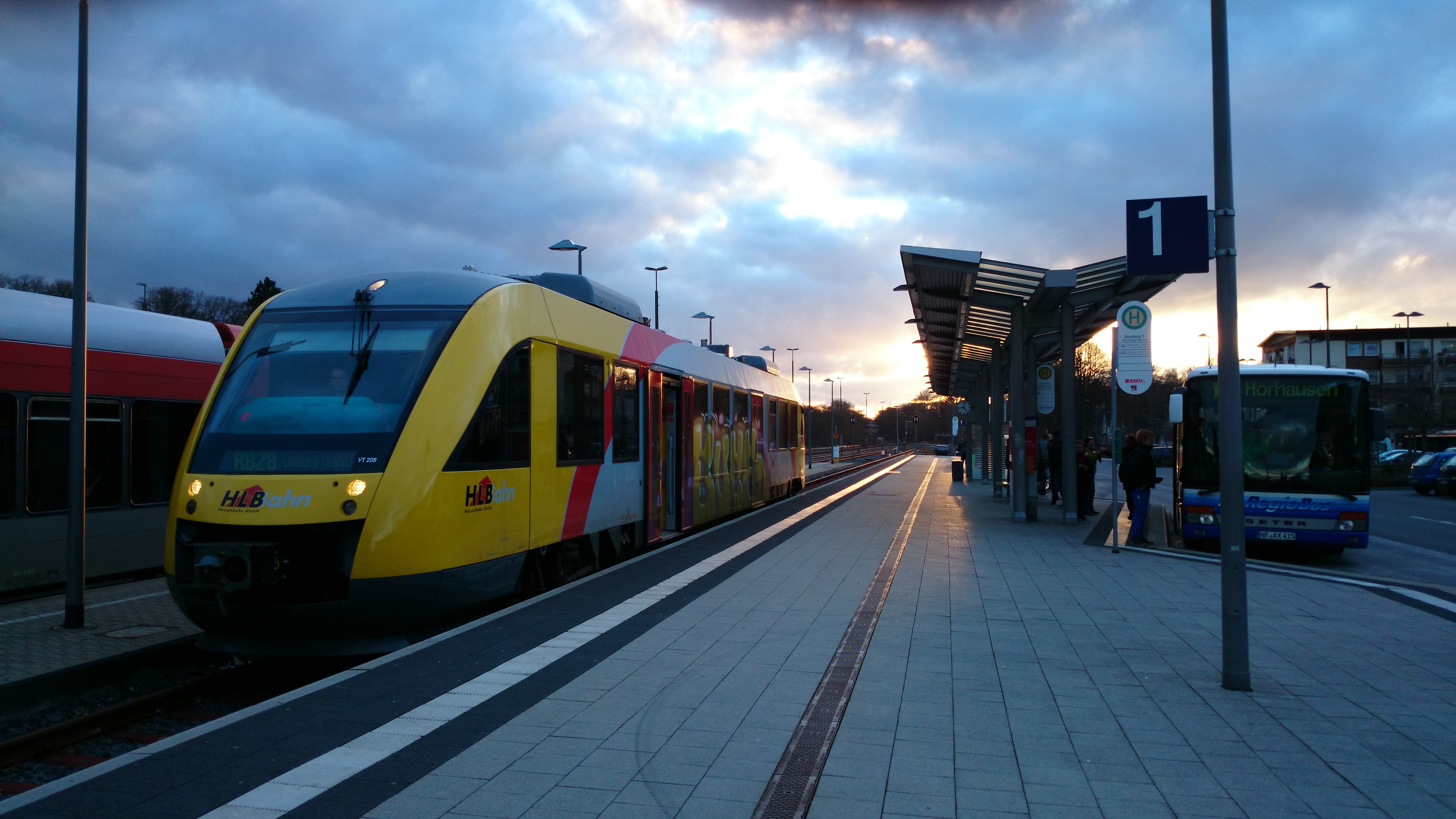
A LINT 27 diesel multiple unit of the Hessische Landesbahn at sunset at Altenkirchen station

=== Passenger services ===
Altenkirchen (Westerwald) station lies on the Oberwesterwald Railway (Au (Sieg)–Altenkirchen (Westerwald)–Westerburg–Limburg (Lahn) (timetable route 461), which was operated between December 2004 and December 2014 by vectus Verkehrsgesellschaft and since December 2014 by Dreiländerbahn, a subsidiary of Hessische Landesbahn. Each day, the line is served by hourly RB 90 (Westerwald-Sieg-Bahn) services under the Rhineland-Palatinate regular-interval integrated timetable on behalf of Zweckverband SPNV Nord (northern Rhineland-Palatinate rail transport association). Additional services run on the Betzdorf–Altenkirchen section from Monday to Friday during the peak hour meaning that there are services at 30-minute intervals.

The line was served from 1998 by older, refurbished Stadler GTW 2/6 railcars and since 2006 by newer Coradia LINT 27 (class 640) and two-part LINT 41 (class 648) railcars manufactured by ALSTOM LHB.

Altenkirchen station is located in the fare zone 910 of the Verkehrsverbund Rhein-Mosel (VRM).

Line	Route	Interval
RB 90 (Westerwald-Sieg-Bahn)	Siegen Hbf – Betzdorf – Au (Sieg) – Altenkirchen (Westerw) – Nistertal-Bad Marienberg – Hachenburg – Westerburg – Staffel – Diez Ost – Limburg (Lahn)	Hourly. Extra services in the peak between Betzdorf and Altenkirchen.

=== Freight traffic ===
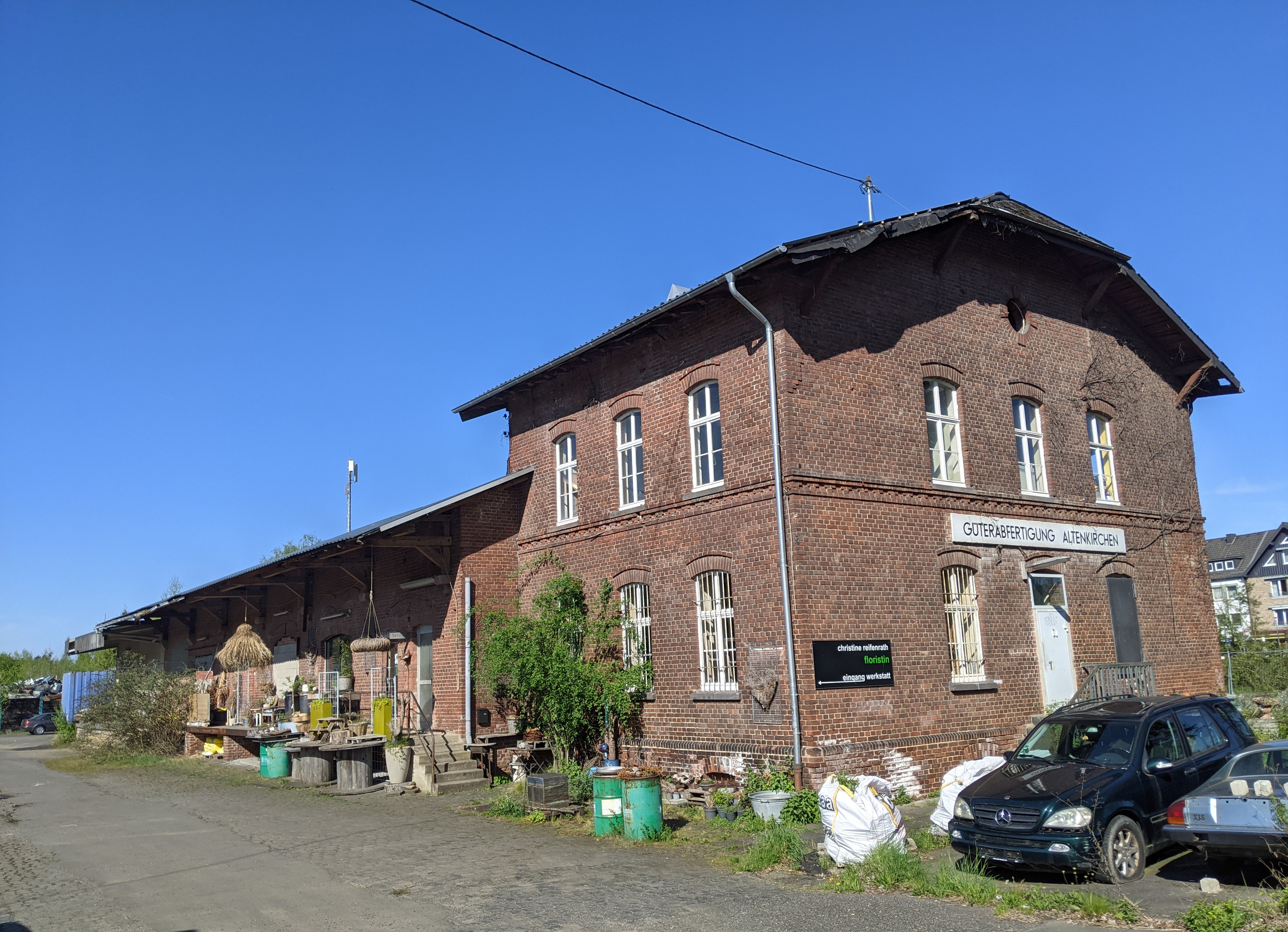
Fright station Altenkirchen

Freight is handled at Altenkirchen operating over the Holzbach Valley Railway (Siershahn–Altenkirchen section of the Engers–Au railway). Since 2006, Westerwaldbahn GmbH (WEBA) has been serving freight customers by rail on the Selters–Raubach–Flammersfeld–Altenkirchen route, including a siding in Neitersen and the Schutztankbau company in Selters, where the line runs between the factory buildings. Class On Rail DH 1004 diesel locomotives are used. Lappwaldbahn GmbH later operated the Holzbach Valley. Since 2025, it has been operated by the newly founded Holzbachtalbahn GmbH.

=== Bus services ===
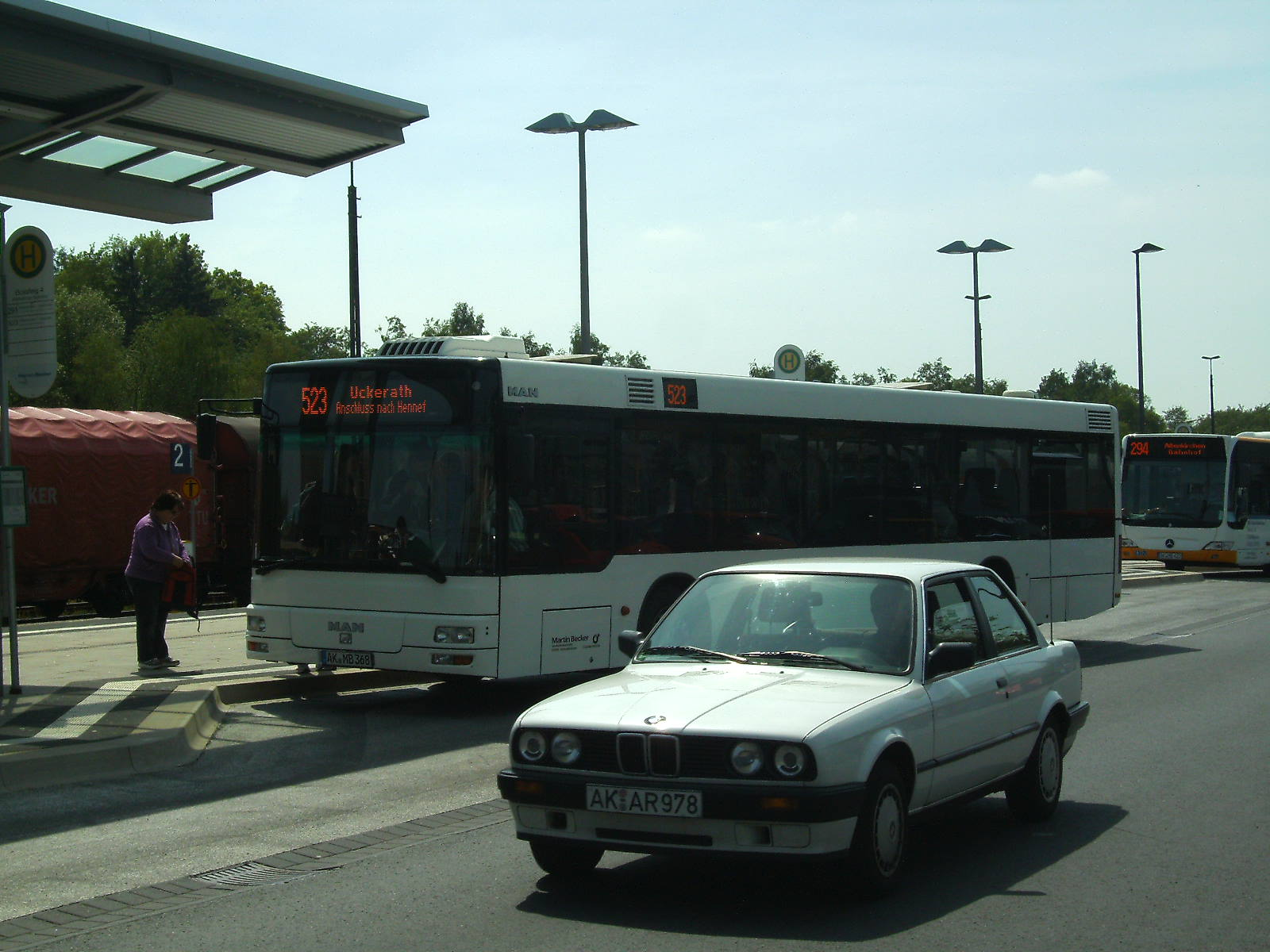
Local bus at Altenkirchen train station

Regional bus services are mostly operated by the Rhenus-Veniro Group-owned company Martin Becker.

The regional bus lines 120, 121, 122, 123, 124, 126, 127, 136, 250, 251, 255, 280, 285, 287, 289, 408, 416 and 934 serve the train stations bus section and some other stops close to the train station.

=== B+R / P+R ===
A Bike and ride as well as a Park and ride facility are located at Altenkirchen train station.

== Fare/transport associations ==
Verkehrsverbund Rhein-Mosel

Due to the location in the Altenkirchen district, Altenkirchen station is loctaed in the area of the transport association Verkehrsverbund Rhein-Mosel (VRM), also the Rheinland-Tarif applies for rides that start or end in the Rheinland-Tarif area.

== Weblinks ==
- historic Altenkirchen, page about the Altenkirchen stations history
