= Linkenbach =

- Municipality
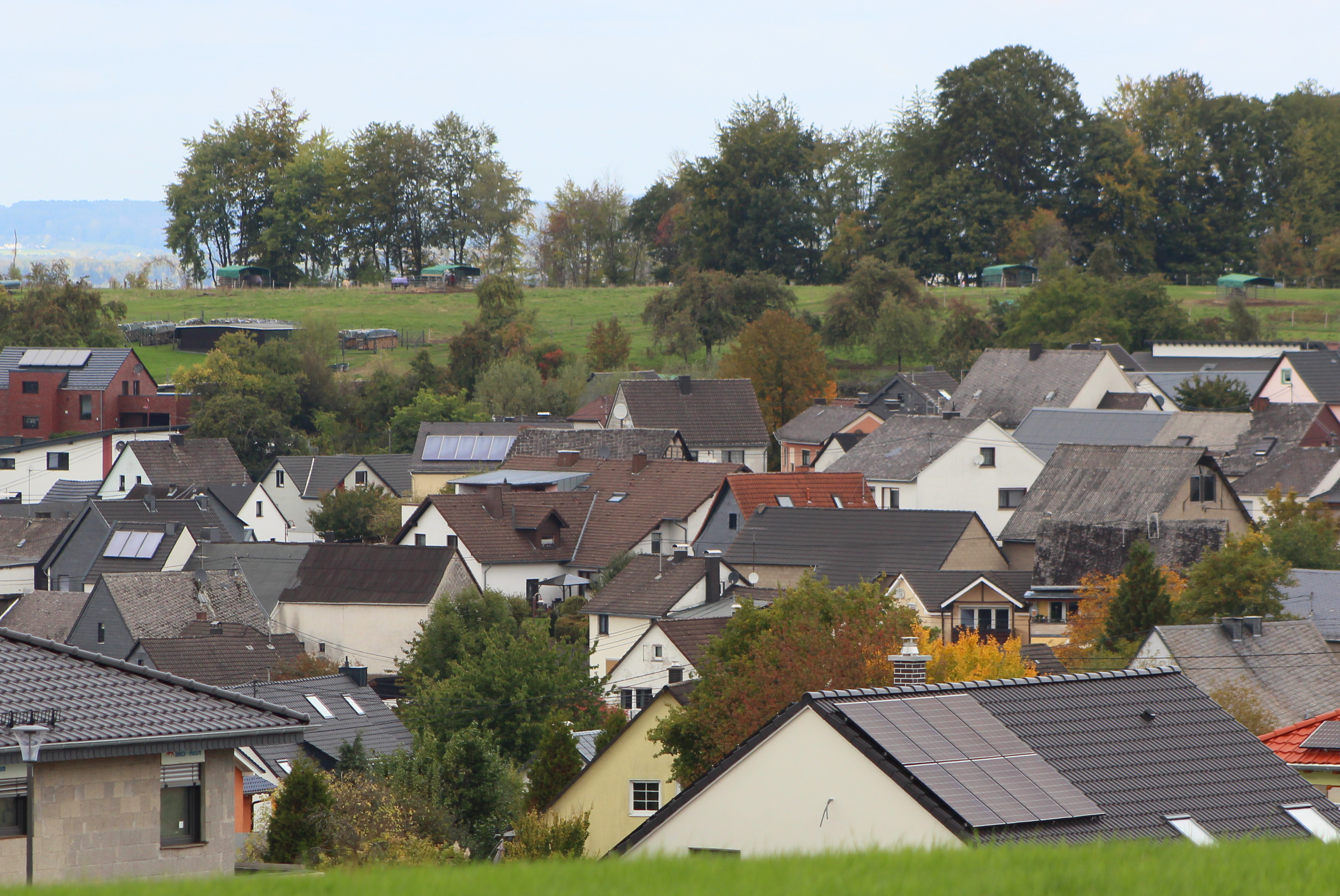

- Coat of arms

- Location of Linkenbach within Neuwied district
- Interactive map of Linkenbach
- Location within Germany Location within Rhineland-Palatinate
- Coordinates: 50°34′19″N 07°33′21″E
- Country: Germany
- State: Rhineland-Palatinate
- District: Neuwied
- Municipal assoc.: Puderbach

Government
  - Mayor (2019–24): Achim Hoffmann

Area
  - Total: 5.43 km^{2} (2.10 sq mi)
- Elevation: 340 m (1,120 ft)

Population (2025-12-31)
  - Total: 629
  - Density: 116/km^{2} (300/sq mi)
- Time zone: UTC+01:00 (CET)
  - Summer (DST): UTC+02:00 (CEST)
- Postal codes: 56317
- Dialling codes: 02684
- Vehicle registration: NR
- Website: www.linkenbach.net

Linkenbach (German pronunciation: [ˈlɪŋkn̩bax]) is a municipality in the district of Neuwied, in Rhineland-Palatinate, Germany.
