= Rodenbach bei Puderbach =

- Municipality
- Coat of arms

- Location of Rodenbach bei Puderbach within Neuwied district
- Interactive map of Rodenbach bei Puderbach
- Location within Germany Location within Rhineland-Palatinate
- Coordinates: 50°38′23″N 7°38′59″E
- Country: Germany
- State: Rhineland-Palatinate
- District: Neuwied
- Municipal assoc.: Puderbach
- Subdivisions: 2

Government
  - Mayor (2019–24): Werner Wenzel

Area
  - Total: 6.62 km^{2} (2.56 sq mi)
- Elevation: 310 m (1,020 ft)

Population (2025-12-31)
  - Total: 701
  - Density: 106/km^{2} (274/sq mi)
- Time zone: UTC+01:00 (CET)
  - Summer (DST): UTC+02:00 (CEST)
- Postal codes: 57639
- Dialling codes: 02684
- Vehicle registration: NR
- Website: www.puderbach.de

Rodenbach bei Puderbach is a municipality in the district of Neuwied, in Rhineland-Palatinate, Germany.
