= Uvo Hölscher =

German classical philologist (1914–1996)

- Born: 8 March 1914; Halle, Germany
- Died: 31 December 1996 (aged 82); Munich, Germany
- Education: Ludwig-Maximilians-Universität München; University of Frankfurt am Main
- Occupations: classical philologist university professor writer
- Spouse: Dorothea Hölscher-Lohmeyer (1913-2008)
- Children: Tonio; Lucian
- Parent(s): Gustav Hölscher (1877-1955); Borghild Gjessing (1882-1930)

Uvo Hölscher (8 March 1914 – 31 December 1996) was a German classical philologist.

== Life ==
Uvo Hölscher was born, the younger of his parents' two recorded sons, in Halle. His father, Gustav Hölscher was a theologian. His mother, born Borghild Gjessing, was the daughter of a school director from Oslo. His grandfather, Wilhelm Hölscher, was also a theologian.

Uvo Hölscher attended secondary schools in Marburg and Bonn. He moved on to the University of Tübingen and the Ludwig-Maximilians-Universität München where he studied natural sciences and cultural sciences, then progressing to the University of Frankfurt am Main where he studied classical philology, enthused in particular by the lecturer Karl Reinhardt. It was at Reinhardt's regular Saturday morning gatherings that he met Max Kommerell and his student contemporary Dorothea Lohmeyer, whom in 1940 he married. In 1937, he received his doctorate for a dissertation on "The Philosophy of Empedocles", supervised for the work by Reinhardt. The next day he was conscripted for his military service. He nevertheless managed to receive his habilitation in 1944, during a brief vacation with Bruno Snell in Hamburg. However, his dissertation, which concerned the use of the Ekkyklema machine in Greek drama, was not published, and he was obliged to provide the party with a statement that he would never apply to become a professor. After the war ended he was imprisoned under conditions that became particularly harsh after he had tried to escape.

He was released in 1946 and his habilitation was re-awarded, this time at the Ludwig-Maximilians-Universität München where for a time he was the sole representative of his discipline at the university, till he was joined by Friedrich Klingner and Rudolf Pfeiffer. After a period in England, in 1954 Hölscher was appointed a professor at the recently launched Free University of Berlin. He transferred to Heidelberg University in 1962 and then, in 1970, returned as a professor to LMU Munich (Ludwig-Maximilians-Universität München).

Hölscher's work followed the trajectory set by his mentor, Karl Reinhardt. His work covered early Greek epic poetry, especially that of Homer, and Pre-Socratic philosophy. His best known book is a justification for classical philology, "Die Chance des Unbehagens - Zur Situation der klassischen Studien" (1965). His formulation of the "adjacent stranger" is often cited when describing the relationship between the modern age and antiquity. His most important work is "Die Odyssee – Epos zwischen Märchen und Roman" (1988).

== Memberships and honours ==
- Between 1969 and 1971, Hölscher was a full member of the Heidelberg Academy of Sciences and Humanities. He remained a corresponding member after his move to LMU Munich.
- Between 1978 and 1990 he served as president of the Hölderlin Society.
- In 1989 he was the winner of Pforzheim's Reuchlin Prize.

== Output (selection) ==
- Die Odyssee. Epos zwischen Märchen und Roman. 3. Auflage. Beck, München 1990, ISBN 3-406-33390-7.
- Die Chance des Unbehagens. 3 Essais zur Situation der klassischen Studien. Vandenhoeck & Ruprecht, Göttingen 1965.
- Das nächste Fremde. Von Texten der griechischen Frühzeit und ihrem Reflex in der Moderne. Beck, München 1994, ISBN 3-406-38505-2 (collected essays, also including a biography of Hölscher).
- Strömungen der deutschen Gräzistik in den Zwanziger Jahren. In: Hellmut Flashar (compiler-editor): Altertumswissenschaft in den 20er Jahren. Steiner, Stuttgart 1995, ISBN 3-515-06569-5.
