= Karl Reinhardt (philologist) =

German classical philologist (1886–1958)

Karl Ludwig Reinhardt (February 14, 1886 – January 9, 1958) was a German classical philologist.

== Life ==
Reinhardt was born in Detmold, and grew up in Frankfurt, the city to which his father, the educational reformer Karl Reinhardt Sr., had been called in 1886 to serve as head of the Lessing-Gymnasium. In Frankfurt the younger Reinhardt studied at the Goethe-Gymnasium, a secondary school founded in 1897 on the principles of his father's Frankfurter Lehrplan ("Frankfurt Teaching Plan"), and directed by him from 1897 to 1904.

Karl Ludwig was the grandson of businessman Carl Johann Freudenberg, founder of the Freudenberg Group (Unternehmensgruppe Freudenberg).

In 1905, he began studying classical philology at the University of Bonn and the Humboldt University of Berlin. There he received his doctorate in 1910 under Ulrich von Wilamowitz-Moellendorff. Upon graduation, he taught at the universities of Bonn, Marburg, and Hamburg, until he was called to the University of Frankfurt in 1924. He remained there until he was named Professor of Classical Philology Emeritus in 1951, except for the years 1942–1945, when he was at the University of Leipzig. He became a regular member of the Saxon Academy of Sciences at the time of his call to Leipzig. In 1937 The Bavarian Academy of Sciences named him a corresponding member.

Professor Karl Ludwig Reinhardt is considered one of the leading Hellenists of his time. He is perhaps best known for his researches on Posidonius, but he also wrote highly original monographs on the Presocratics, Aeschylus, and Sophocles. Although he was mainly a disciple of Wilamowitz, for a time in his youth he came under the influence of Nietzsche and the poetic circle of Stefan George. His many writings in turn had a profound effect on the thought of Ernst Cassirer, Martin Heidegger and Wolfgang Schadewaldt.

In 1952 Reinhardt was inducted into the Order Pour le mérite für Wissenschaften und Künste and in 1956 was awarded an honorary doctorate from the University of Frankfurt. He died in Frankfurt am Main.

== Writings ==
- Parmenides und die Geschichte der griechischen Philosophie (1916
- Poseidonios von Apameia: Der Rhodier genannt (1921)
- Kosmos und Sympathie (1926)
- Platons Mythen (1927)
- Sophokles (1933)
- Aischylos als Regisseur und Theologe (1948)
- Von Werken und Formen (1948)
- Die Iliad und ihr Dichter. Edited and published posthumously by Uvo Hölscher (1961)
- Erinnerungen an einen Lehrer (1961)
- Erinnerungen (n.d.)

== Sources ==
- Wolfgang Klötzer (ed.) Frankfurter Biographie. Zweiter Band M-Z. Verlag Waldemar Kramer, Frankfurt am Main, 1996, ISBN 3-7829-0459-1
- Inge Auerbach. Catalogus professorum academiae Marburgensis. 2º vol: 1910 bis 1971. Marburg 1979, pp. 590–591
- Uvo Hölscher. Karl Reinhardt (1886–1958). Karl Reinhard absconditus. In: Eikasmós. 4, 1993, pp. 295–304
- Wolfgang Klötzer (ed.) Frankfurter Biographie. 2 vols. M–Z. Verlag Waldemar Kramer, Frankfurt am Main, 1996, ISBN 3-7829-0459-1
