= Oberdreis =

- Municipality
- Coat of arms

- Location of Oberdreis within Neuwied district
- Interactive map of Oberdreis
- Location within Germany Location within Rhineland-Palatinate
- Coordinates: 50°37′45″N 7°39′51″E
- Country: Germany
- State: Rhineland-Palatinate
- District: Neuwied
- Municipal assoc.: Puderbach
- Subdivisions: 4

Government
  - Mayor (2024–2029): Julian Klein

Area
  - Total: 9.00 km^{2} (3.47 sq mi)
- Elevation: 285 m (935 ft)

Population (2025-12-31)
  - Total: 870
  - Density: 97/km^{2} (250/sq mi)
- Time zone: UTC+01:00 (CET)
  - Summer (DST): UTC+02:00 (CEST)
- Postal codes: 57639
- Dialling codes: 02684
- Vehicle registration: NR
- Website: www.puderbach.de

Oberdreis is a municipality in the district of Neuwied, located in the northern part of the federal state of Rhineland-Palatinate, Germany. The village is part of the Verbandsgemeinde Puderbach, a collective municipality within the Westerwald region.

== Geography ==
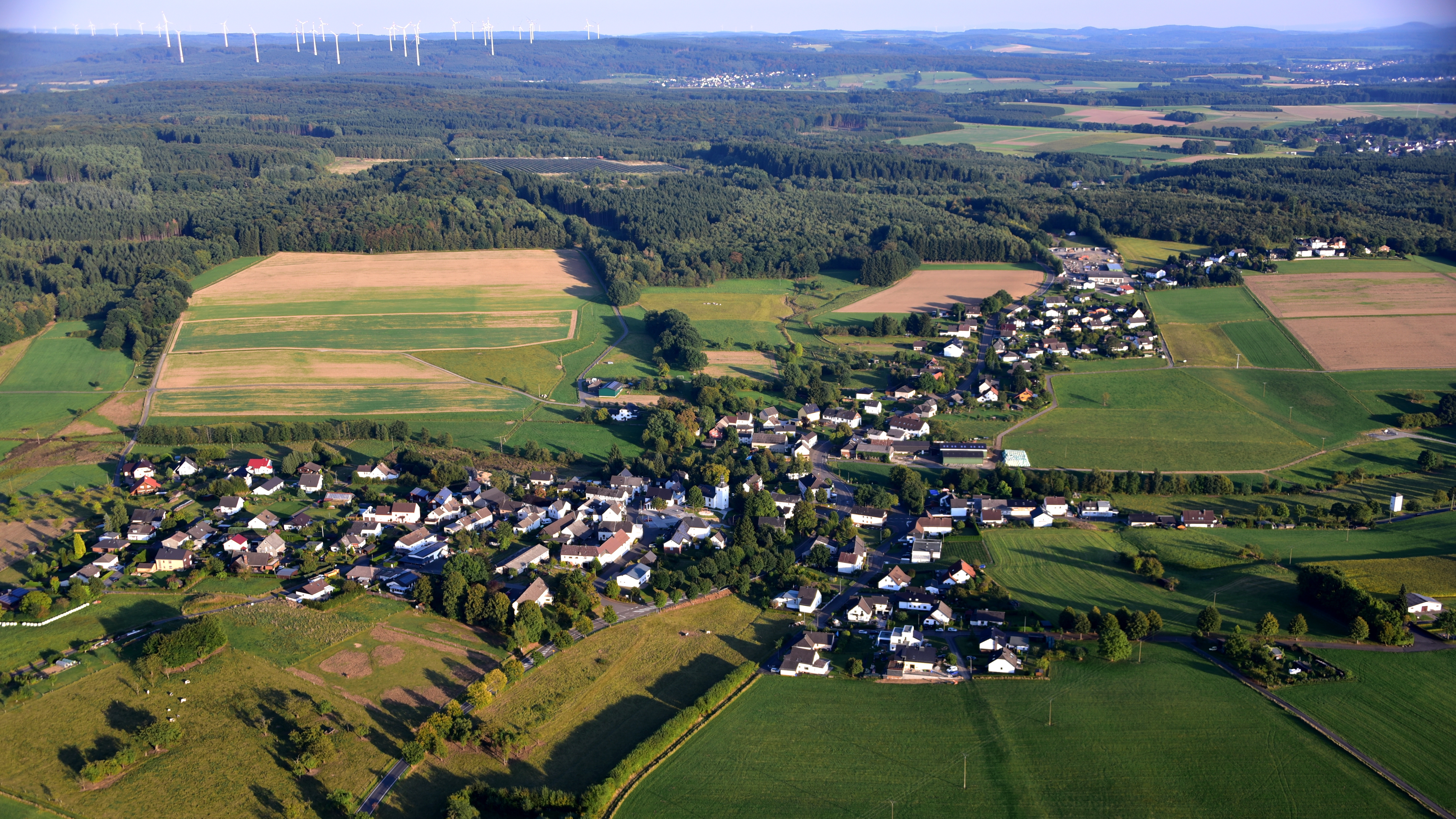
District Oberdreis

Oberdreis is situated on the northeastern edge of the Rhein-Westerwald Nature Park, slightly removed from major transportation routes. The municipality includes the districts of Lautzert and Dendert, as well as the residential areas Guter Trunk Marie (a former quarry known as 'Tonzeche') and Sonnenhof. The village lies at an elevation of approximately 285 metres.

== Governance ==
=== Municipal Council ===
The municipal council of Oberdreis consists of 12 elected members and the honorary mayor, who serves as the council’s chair. The most recent election was held on 9 June 2024.

=== Mayor ===
The current mayor, Julian Klein, took office on 3 July 2024, after being directly elected with 89.7% of the votes. Previous mayors include Ralf Engel (2019–2024) and Dieter Klein-Ventur (1999–2019).

== Culture and Landmarks ==
=== Evangelical Church of Oberdreis ===
The village’s evangelical church dates back to at least 1253. Originally built as a fortified church, it served military purposes during the Thirty Years' War. The church underwent significant reconstruction in the late 18th century and was last renovated in 2002. The site also houses the grave of Paul Deussen, a renowned philosopher and friend of Friedrich Nietzsche.

=== Historical Oil Mill ===
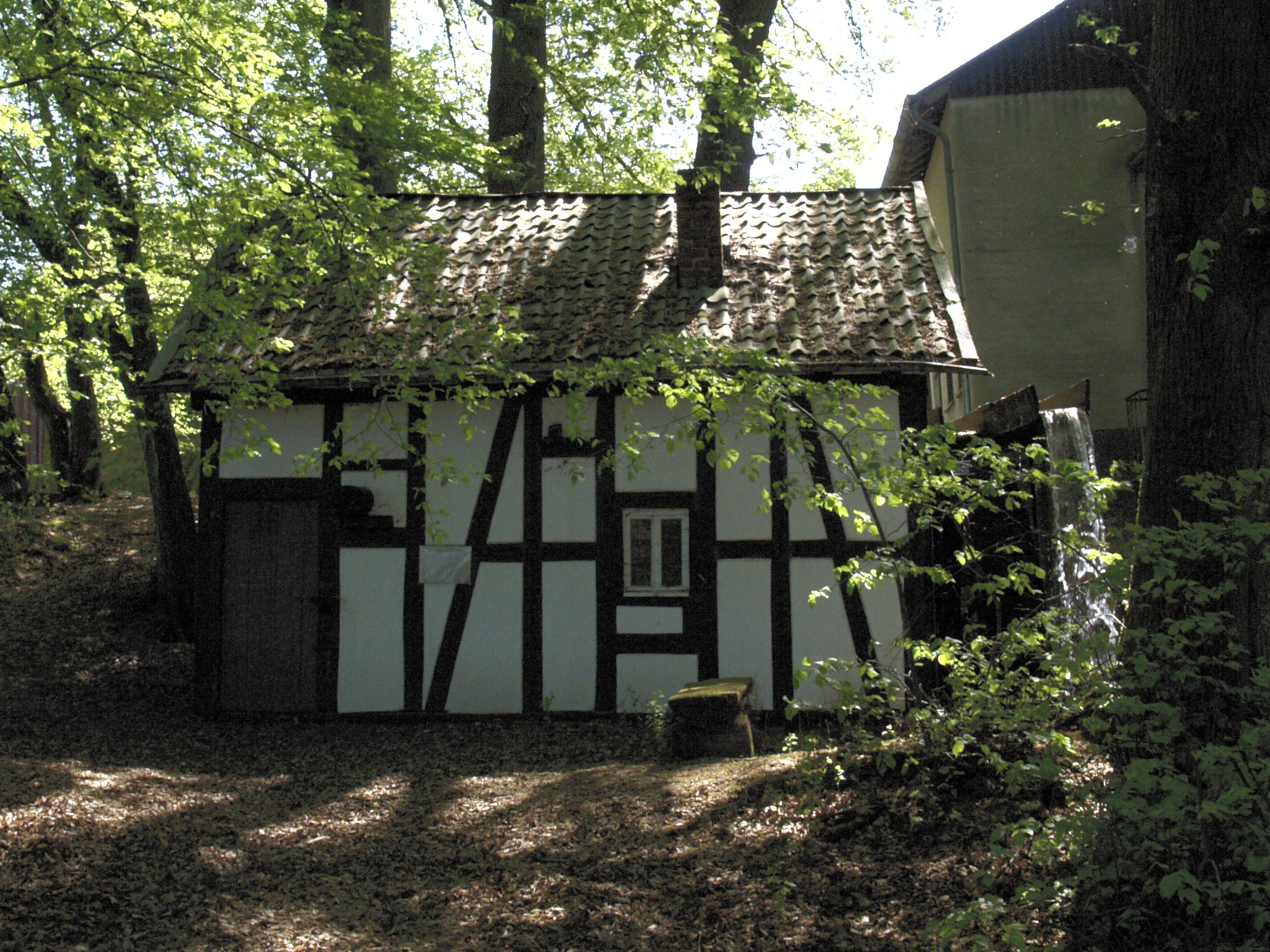
Historical oil mill

The "Owerdresser Ollichsmill", a 300-year-old oil mill, is a notable example of local half-timbered architecture. Restored in 1980, the mill retains its original equipment, including a stamp-powered wedge press and waterwheel.

=== Backhaus (Bakehouse) ===
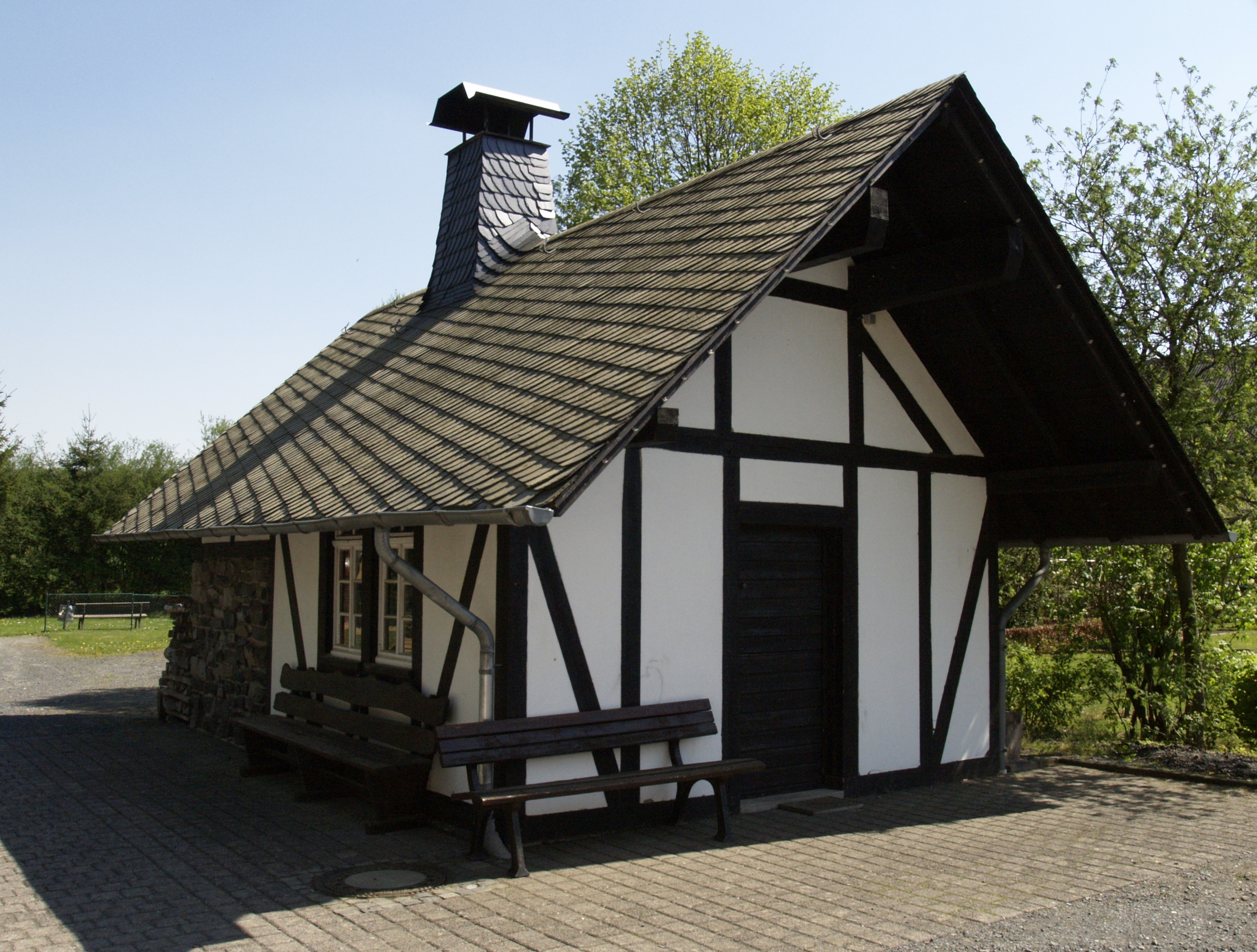
Bakehouse in the village center

Next to the former fire station stands a traditional bakehouse, where bread is still baked every two weeks using a stone oven.

=== Beilstein ===
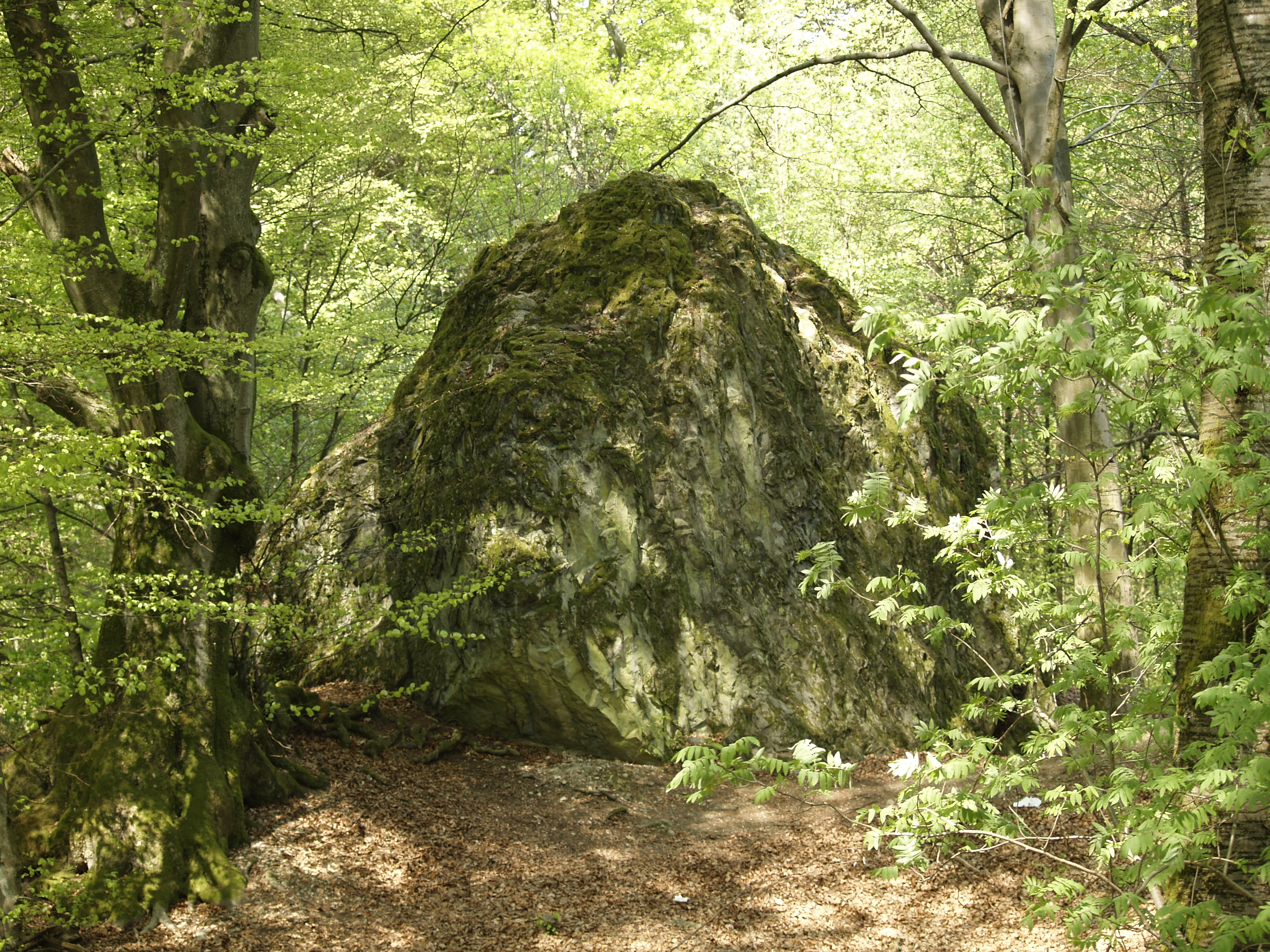
Beilstein

The "Beilstein", a basalt volcanic cone, is a natural monument in the Oberdreis forest. While no longer part of the main trail network, it's infrequently a destination for climbing and abseiling.

== Renewable Energy ==
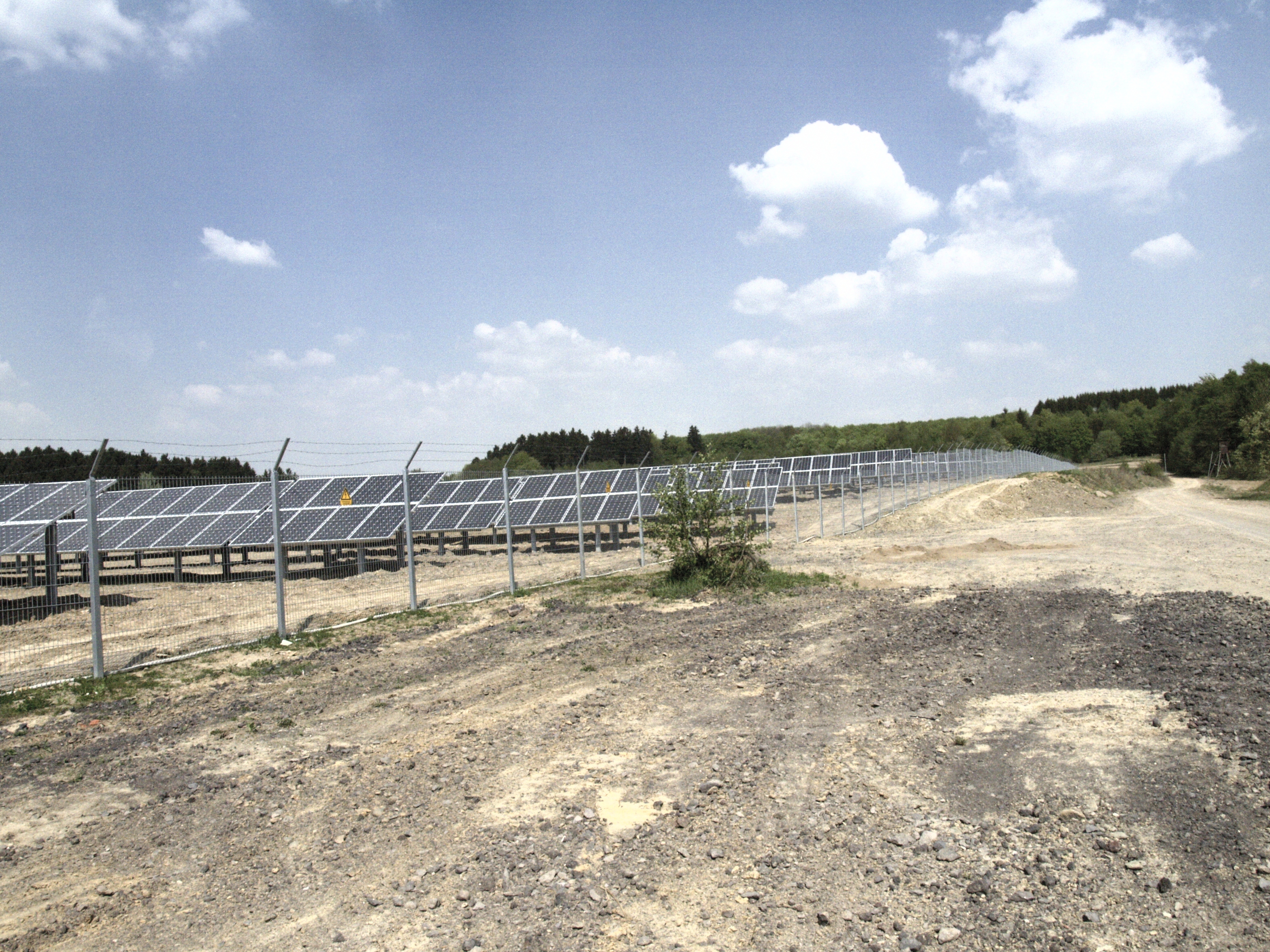
photovoltaic plant in Oberdreis forest

Oberdreis has invested in renewable energy with a 5.6-hectare photovoltaic plant, operational since 2011, generating enough electricity to power 170 households annually.
