= Dernbach, Neuwied =

Dernbach
- Municipality
- Coat of arms

- Location of Dernbach within Neuwied district
- Interactive map of Dernbach
- Location within Germany Location within Rhineland-Palatinate
- Coordinates: 50°32′41″N 7°36′06″E
- Country: Germany
- State: Rhineland-Palatinate
- District: Neuwied
- Municipal assoc.: Puderbach

Government
  - Mayor (2019–24): Heinz-Rudi Becker

Area
  - Total: 5.5 km^{2} (2.1 sq mi)
- Elevation: 307 m (1,007 ft)

Population (2025-12-31)
  - Total: 1,114
  - Density: 200/km^{2} (520/sq mi)
- Time zone: UTC+01:00 (CET)
  - Summer (DST): UTC+02:00 (CEST)
- Postal codes: 56307
- Dialling codes: 02689
- Vehicle registration: NR
- Website: www.dernbach-westerwald.de

Dernbach (German pronunciation: [ˈdɛʁnbax]) is a municipality in the district of Neuwied, in Rhineland-Palatinate, Germany.
