= Kasbach-Ohlenberg =

- Municipality
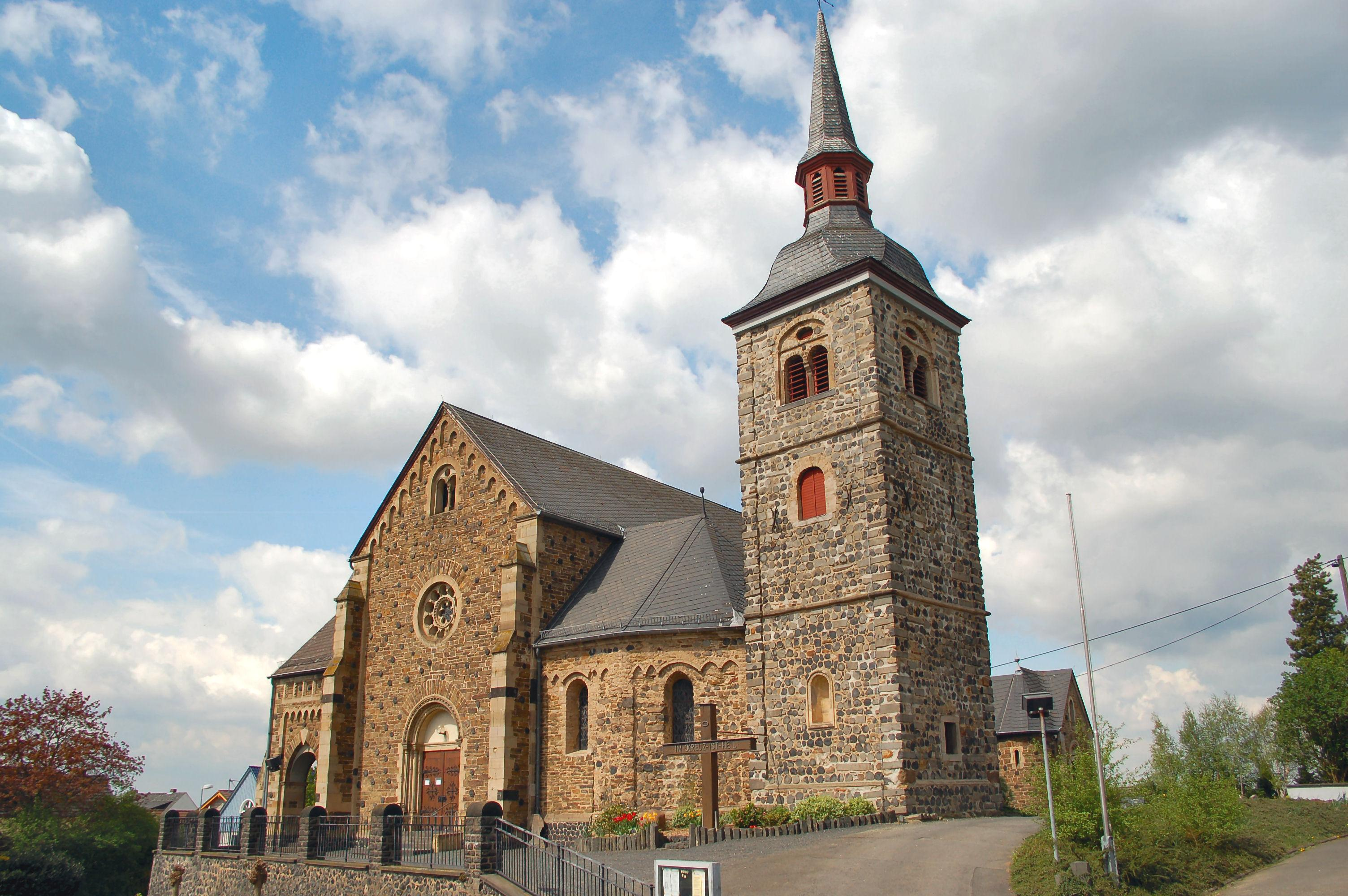
- Church

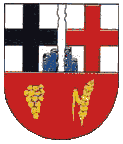
- Coat of arms

- Location of Kasbach-Ohlenberg within Neuwied district
- Interactive map of Kasbach-Ohlenberg
- Location within Germany Location within Rhineland-Palatinate
- Coordinates: 50°35′15″N 7°16′36″E
- Country: Germany
- State: Rhineland-Palatinate
- District: Neuwied
- Subdivisions: 3

Government
  - Mayor (2019–24): Frank Becker

Area
  - Total: 4.78 km^{2} (1.85 sq mi)
- Elevation: 194 m (636 ft)

Population (2025-12-31)
  - Total: 1,414
  - Density: 296/km^{2} (766/sq mi)
- Time zone: UTC+01:00 (CET)
  - Summer (DST): UTC+02:00 (CEST)
- Postal codes: 53547
- Dialling codes: 02644
- Vehicle registration: NR
- Website: www.vg-linz.de

Kasbach-Ohlenberg is a municipality in the district of Neuwied, in Rhineland-Palatinate, Germany.

== Transport ==
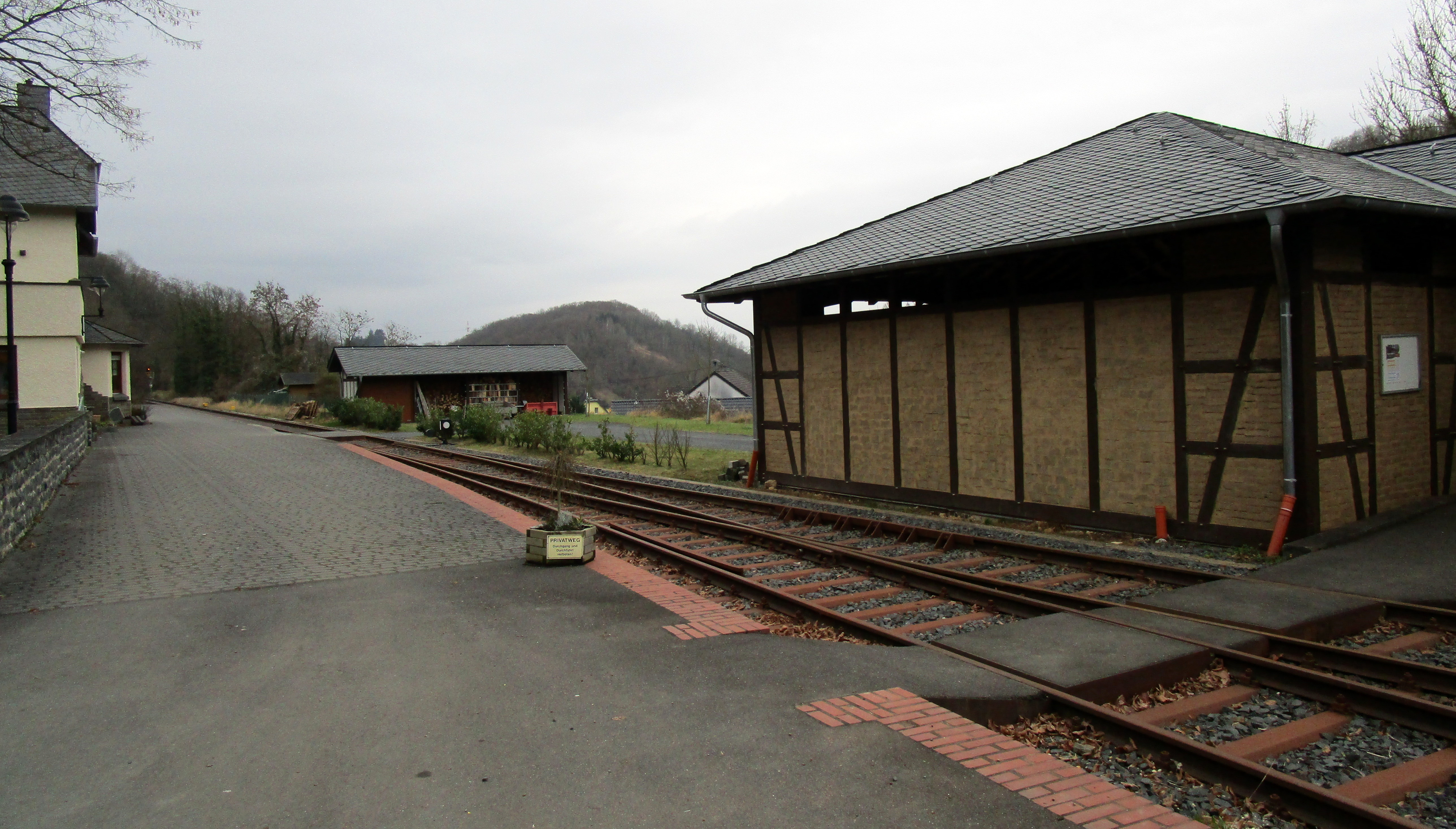
Former Kasbach train station

There was a train station of the Kasbachtal railway (Linz (Rhine) - Flammersfeld), which is out of service today, located in Kasbach.
