= Puderbach (Verbandsgemeinde) =

Municipality in Rhineland-Palatinate, Germany

- Verbandsgemeinde
- Location of Puderbach within Neuwied district
- Interactive map of Puderbach
- Location within Germany Location within Rhineland-Palatinate
- Coordinates: 50°36′N 7°37′E
- Country: Germany
- State: Rhineland-Palatinate
- District: Neuwied
- Seat: Puderbach
- Subdivisions: 16 municipalities

Area
  - Total: 95.71 km^{2} (36.95 sq mi)

Population (2025-12-31)
  - Total: 15,640
  - Density: 163.4/km^{2} (423.2/sq mi)
- Time zone: UTC+01:00 (CET)
  - Summer (DST): UTC+02:00 (CEST)
- Website: www.puderbach.de

Puderbach is a Verbandsgemeinde ("collective municipality") in the district of Neuwied, in Rhineland-Palatinate, Germany. The seat of the Verbandsgemeinde is in Puderbach.

The Verbandsgemeinde Puderbach consists of the following Ortsgemeinden ("local municipalities"):

1. Dernbach
2. Döttesfeld
3. Dürrholz
4. Hanroth
5. Harschbach
6. Linkenbach
7. Niederhofen
8. Niederwambach
9. Oberdreis
10. Puderbach
11. Ratzert
12. Raubach
13. Rodenbach bei Puderbach
14. Steimel
15. Urbach
16. Woldert
