= Hanroth =

- Municipality
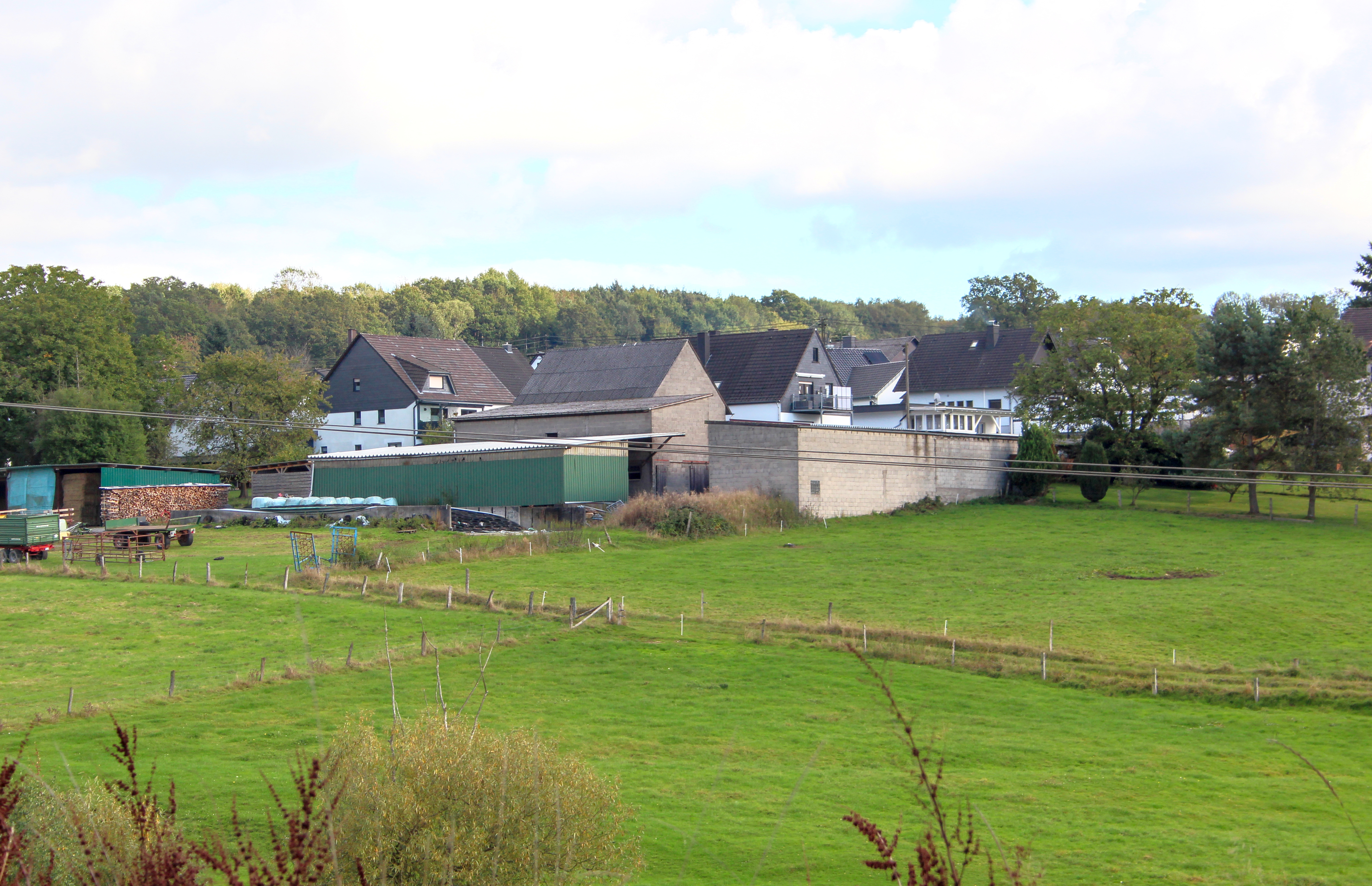

- Coat of arms

- Location of Hanroth within Neuwied district
- Interactive map of Hanroth
- Location within Germany Location within Rhineland-Palatinate
- Coordinates: 50°35′21″N 07°38′34″E
- Country: Germany
- State: Rhineland-Palatinate
- District: Neuwied
- Municipal assoc.: Puderbach

Government
  - Mayor (2019–24): Claus Keller

Area
  - Total: 2.43 km^{2} (0.94 sq mi)
- Elevation: 270 m (890 ft)

Population (2025-12-31)
  - Total: 662
  - Density: 272/km^{2} (706/sq mi)
- Time zone: UTC+01:00 (CET)
  - Summer (DST): UTC+02:00 (CEST)
- Postal codes: 56316
- Dialling codes: 02684
- Vehicle registration: NR
- Website: www.puderbach.de

Hanroth is a municipality in the district of Neuwied, in Rhineland-Palatinate, Germany.
