= Harschbach =

- Municipality
- Coat of arms

- Location of Harschbach within Neuwied district
- Interactive map of Harschbach
- Location within Germany Location within Rhineland-Palatinate
- Coordinates: 50°34′24″N 07°35′48″E
- Country: Germany
- State: Rhineland-Palatinate
- District: Neuwied
- Municipal assoc.: Puderbach

Government
  - Mayor (2019–24): Friederike Becker

Area
  - Total: 2.18 km^{2} (0.84 sq mi)
- Elevation: 290 m (950 ft)

Population (2025-12-31)
  - Total: 460
  - Density: 210/km^{2} (550/sq mi)
- Time zone: UTC+01:00 (CET)
  - Summer (DST): UTC+02:00 (CEST)
- Postal codes: 56307
- Dialling codes: 02684
- Vehicle registration: NR
- Website: www.puderbach.de

Harschbach (German pronunciation: [ˈhaʁʃbax]) is a municipality in the district of Neuwied, in Rhineland-Palatinate, Germany.
