= Gustav Hölscher =

German theologian (1877–1955)

- Born: Gustav Diedrich Hillard Hölscher; 17 June 1877; Norden, Hanover, Prussia, Germany
- Died: 16 August 1955 (aged 78); Heidelberg, Baden-Württemberg, West Germany
- Education: Erlangen; Leipzig; Marburg; Halle
- Occupations: Theologian; University professor Old Testament Scholar
- Spouse(s): 1. Borghild Gjessing (1882–1930); 2. Gertrud von Meibom (1889-)
- Children: Wilhelm Hölscher, Egyptologist; Uvo Hölscher (1914–1996) Classical philologist
- Relatives: Tonio Hölscher (grandson); Lucian Hölscher (grandson)

Gustav Hölscher (17 June 1877 - 16 September 1955) was a German Evangelical-Lutheran theologian and a professor of Old Testament Studies.

== Biography ==
Gustav Diedrich Hillard Hölscher was born in Norden, on Germany's North Sea coast and close to the Dutch frontier. Both his parents came from local families and had grown up in the town, but his own childhood was more itinerant. Wilhelm Hölscher, his father, was a Lutheran pastor and also a considerable theological theologian. In 1880, while Gustav was still very small, Wilhelm Hölscher accepted a job as director of studies at Loccum Abbey, which meant the family relocating to the far side of Bremen. Five years after that, in 1885, they relocated again, this time to Leipzig, when Wilhelm Hölscher accepted a pastoral position at the St. Nicholas Church. It was in Leipzig that Gustav Hölscher attended school and grew up: he came to regard it as his own "second home city".

He enrolled as a student at Erlangen, but was dissatisfied with the teaching and left after three terms, returning home to Leipzig where in 1900 he passed his Theology exams. The focus of his study was at this stage on Old and New Testament studies, along with oriental studies which included such ancient languages as Hebrew and Syriac as well as Arabic, Akkadian, Ethiopic and Persian. He was also studying Philosophy. In 1900 he moved to Berlin in order to progress his oriental studies there. In Berlin he also obtained a position as house-tutor to the Counts Bernstorff. There were plans to visit Cairo, but these fell through and he handed in his notice to the Bernstorffs, again returning home to his parents' home in Leipzig where he prepared a dissertation on the territorial history of Palestine. That was accepted by the University Philosophy faculty in 1902. One consequence of the dissertation was an offer from the Deutsche Orient-Gesellschaft to spend half a year with Hermann Thiersch in Palestine in order to investigate future archaeological sites. The six month visit was a formative experience in various ways: during it he resolved to work towards a career as a lecturer in Old Testament Studies.

In 1904 he successfully submitted his doctoral dissertation at the University of Marburg. His Habilitation from the University of Halle followed just a year later, and opened the way to a lifetime careers in the universities sector. As well as various university appointments, he also took on the editorship of the journal of the German Palestine Society and received a supplementary income for work as a Privatdozent (loosely, "university tutor") of Old Testament Studies. On 25 September 1908 Gustav Hölscher married Borghild Gjessing (1882–1930), the daughter of a scholarly Oslo school director from Oslo. In due course the marriage would produce two sons.

In 1912 Hölscher received his first professorship. During 1912/13 he held the Old Testament professorship at the University of Göttingen, and in 1915 he accepted an extraordinary professorship from the University of Halle where he had worked as a Privatdozent since 1905. The faculty at Halle also conferred an honorary doctorate of Theology on him in 1917. In 1920 he accepted a full professorship at the University of Gießen and then, just a year later, at the nearby University of Marburg. Then in 1929 he moved to the University of Bonn where the government asked him to take the lead in setting up a new Theology faculty. As part of his mandate he had a major voice in selecting appointees for newly created teaching chairs, and he was able to recruit for the new faculty three theological scholars who were or subsequently became well-known in academic circles: these were the New Testament scholar Karl Ludwig Schmidt, the influential philosopher-theologian from Basel, Karl Barth and the church historian Ernst Wolf.

Borghild Hölscher died in September/October 1930. In 1934 Gustav Hölscher remarried: his second wife, born Gertrud von Meibom (1889-), was the daughter of a district judge. Gustav Hölscher was no great admirer of the National Socialists who took power in January 1933; and he lost his post at the University of Bonn in or before 1935. By that time all three of the high-profile professors he had played a part in recruiting to the university Theology faculty had also left. There followed a hiatus, but eventually, in 1935, he obtained an appointment at Heidelberg University. Initially he faced political boycotts, but he nevertheless retained his post at Heidelberg through (and beyond) the remaining National Socialist years. In 1936 he became a full member of the Heidelberg Academy of Sciences and Humanities. After the war he became the first dean of the Heidelberg University Faculty of Theology, remaining in post till his retirement in 1949.

Gustav Hölscher died following a short illness in September 1955.

== Works ==
The importance of Hölscher's academic work extends beyond the Old Testament chronicling of Jewish history in the early postcanonical period and the accompanying orientalist issues. Particularly important in the context of research historiography was his attempt, influenced by Wilhelm Wundt, to provide psychological interpretation the old testament prophets in terms of recorded religious history.

An additional focus of his research was on Nicholas of Cusa.
