= Ratzert =

- Municipality
- Coat of arms

- Location of Ratzert within Neuwied district
- Interactive map of Ratzert
- Location within Germany Location within Rhineland-Palatinate
- Coordinates: 50°38′31″N 07°36′42″E
- Country: Germany
- State: Rhineland-Palatinate
- District: Neuwied
- Municipal assoc.: Puderbach

Government
  - Mayor (2019–24): Gerd Schumacher

Area
  - Total: 2.78 km^{2} (1.07 sq mi)
- Elevation: 225 m (738 ft)

Population (2025-12-31)
  - Total: 255
  - Density: 91.7/km^{2} (238/sq mi)
- Time zone: UTC+01:00 (CET)
  - Summer (DST): UTC+02:00 (CEST)
- Postal codes: 57614
- Dialling codes: 02684
- Vehicle registration: NR
- Website: www.ratzert.de

Ratzert is a municipality in the district of Neuwied, in Rhineland-Palatinate, Germany.
