= Niederwambach =

- Municipality
- Coat of arms

- Location of Niederwambach within Neuwied district
- Interactive map of Niederwambach
- Location within Germany Location within Rhineland-Palatinate
- Coordinates: 50°37′58″N 07°35′47″E
- Country: Germany
- State: Rhineland-Palatinate
- District: Neuwied
- Municipal assoc.: Puderbach

Government
  - Mayor (2019–24): Joachim Ramseyer

Area
  - Total: 6.88 km^{2} (2.66 sq mi)
- Elevation: 225 m (738 ft)

Population (2025-12-31)
  - Total: 461
  - Density: 67.0/km^{2} (174/sq mi)
- Time zone: UTC+01:00 (CET)
  - Summer (DST): UTC+02:00 (CEST)
- Postal codes: 57614
- Dialling codes: 02684
- Vehicle registration: NR
- Website: www.puderbach.de

Niederwambach is a municipality in the district of Neuwied, in Rhineland-Palatinate, Germany.
