= Dürrholz =

- Municipality
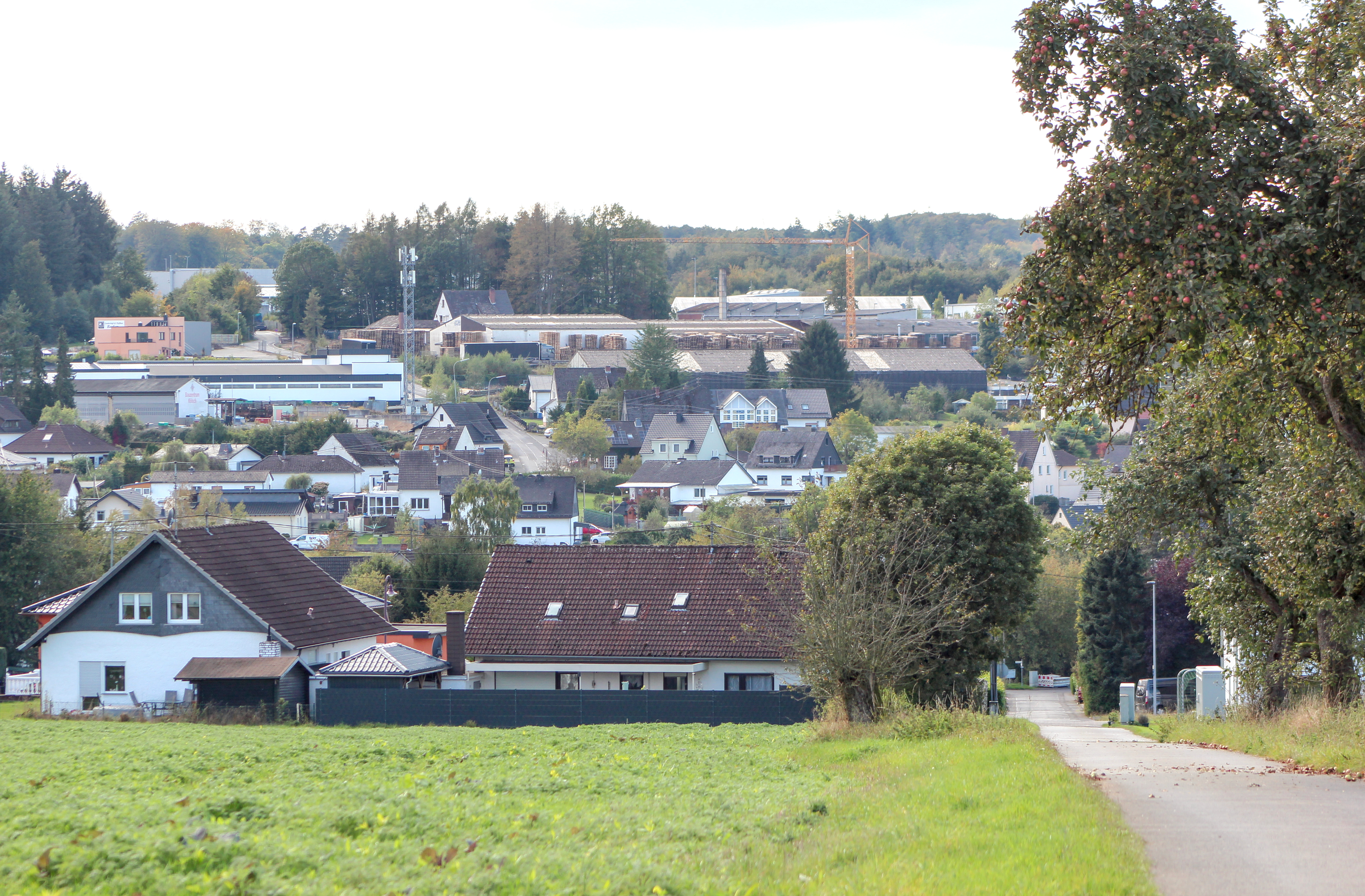

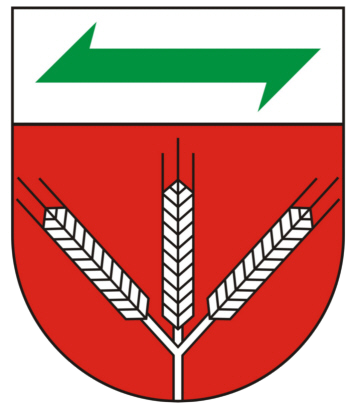
- Coat of arms

- Location of Dürrholz within Neuwied district
- Interactive map of Dürrholz
- Location within Germany Location within Rhineland-Palatinate
- Coordinates: 50°35′12″N 7°34′45″E
- Country: Germany
- State: Rhineland-Palatinate
- District: Neuwied
- Municipal assoc.: Puderbach
- Subdivisions: 3

Government
  - Mayor (2019–24): Anette Wagner

Area
  - Total: 6.9 km^{2} (2.7 sq mi)
- Elevation: 280 m (920 ft)

Population (2025-12-31)
  - Total: 1,348
  - Density: 200/km^{2} (510/sq mi)
- Time zone: UTC+01:00 (CET)
  - Summer (DST): UTC+02:00 (CEST)
- Postal codes: 56307
- Dialling codes: 02684
- Vehicle registration: NR
- Website: www.duerrholz.net

Dürrholz (German pronunciation: [ˈdʏʁhɔlts]) is a municipality in the district of Neuwied, in Rhineland-Palatinate, Germany.
