= Raubach =

- Municipality
- Coat of arms

- Location of Raubach within Neuwied district
- Interactive map of Raubach
- Location within Germany Location within Rhineland-Palatinate
- Coordinates: 50°34′32″N 7°37′39″E
- Country: Germany
- State: Rhineland-Palatinate
- District: Neuwied
- Municipal assoc.: Puderbach
- Subdivisions: 2

Government
  - Mayor (2019–24): Michael Rudolph

Area
  - Total: 7.84 km^{2} (3.03 sq mi)
- Elevation: 220 m (720 ft)

Population (2025-12-31)
  - Total: 2,138
  - Density: 273/km^{2} (706/sq mi)
- Time zone: UTC+01:00 (CET)
  - Summer (DST): UTC+02:00 (CEST)
- Postal codes: 56316
- Dialling codes: 02684
- Vehicle registration: NR
- Website: www.puderbach.de

Raubach (German pronunciation: [ˈʁaʊbax]) is a municipality in the district of Neuwied, in Rhineland-Palatinate, Germany.

== Transport ==
Raubach islocated on the Engers-Au railway line, but the service of passenger trains has discontinues on the section between Siershahn and Altenkirchen.
