= Urbach, Rhineland-Palatinate =

Urbach
- Municipality
- Coat of arms

- Location of Urbach within Neuwied district
- Interactive map of Urbach
- Location within Germany Location within Rhineland-Palatinate
- Coordinates: 50°33′42″N 07°35′29″E
- Country: Germany
- State: Rhineland-Palatinate
- District: Neuwied
- Municipal assoc.: Puderbach

Government
  - Mayor (2019–24): Brigitte Hasenbring

Area
  - Total: 11.29 km^{2} (4.36 sq mi)
- Elevation: 281 m (922 ft)

Population (2025-12-31)
  - Total: 1,450
  - Density: 128/km^{2} (333/sq mi)
- Time zone: UTC+01:00 (CET)
  - Summer (DST): UTC+02:00 (CEST)
- Postal codes: 56317
- Dialling codes: 02684
- Vehicle registration: NR
- Website: www.urbach-ww.de

Urbach (German pronunciation: [ˈuːɐ̯bax]) is a municipality in the district of Neuwied, in Rhineland-Palatinate, Germany.
