= Mademühlen =

- Ortsteil of Driedorf
- Interactive map of Mademühlen
- Location within Germany Location within Hesse
- Coordinates: 50°37′24″N 08°9′55″E
- Country: Germany
- State: Hesse
- Municipality: Driedorf

Area
  - Total: 8.88 km^{2} (3.43 sq mi)
- Elevation: 596 m (1,955 ft)

Population (2020)
  - Total: 885
  - Density: 99.7/km^{2} (258/sq mi)
- Time zone: UTC+01:00 (CET)
  - Summer (DST): UTC+02:00 (CEST)
- Postal codes: 35759
- Dialling codes: 02775

Mademühlen is a village in the municipality of Driedorf in the Westerwald hill region in Lahn-Dill-Kreis in the German state of Hesse. Its population was 885 on 30 June 2020, and its area is 8.88 km^{2} (3.43 sq mi).

== Location ==
Mademühlen lies within the protected area of Hessian Westerwald (Hessischer Westerwald) and within the European network of such areas, Natura 2000.

The village is on the upper reaches of the Rehbach stream, between two reservoirs and owes its name to a number of mills which were established over the centuries on the upper course of the Rehbach. Around 1800 it was described as a rich farming village. A typical Westerwald farmhouse from Mademühlen is display in the Hessenpark Open Air Museum.

== Transport links ==
Mademühlen was located at the Cross Westerwald Railway (Montabaur - Wallmerod - Westerburg - Rennerod - Herborn), which nowadays is out of service, (except fright traffic between Wallmerod and Montabaur), but rides with railbikes take place organized by the interest group IG Westerwald Querbahn e. V., an extension to Höhn is in planning.
