= Goethe-Gymnasium, Frankfurt =

School in Frankfurt, Germany

Coordinates: 50°06′40″N 8°39′31″E

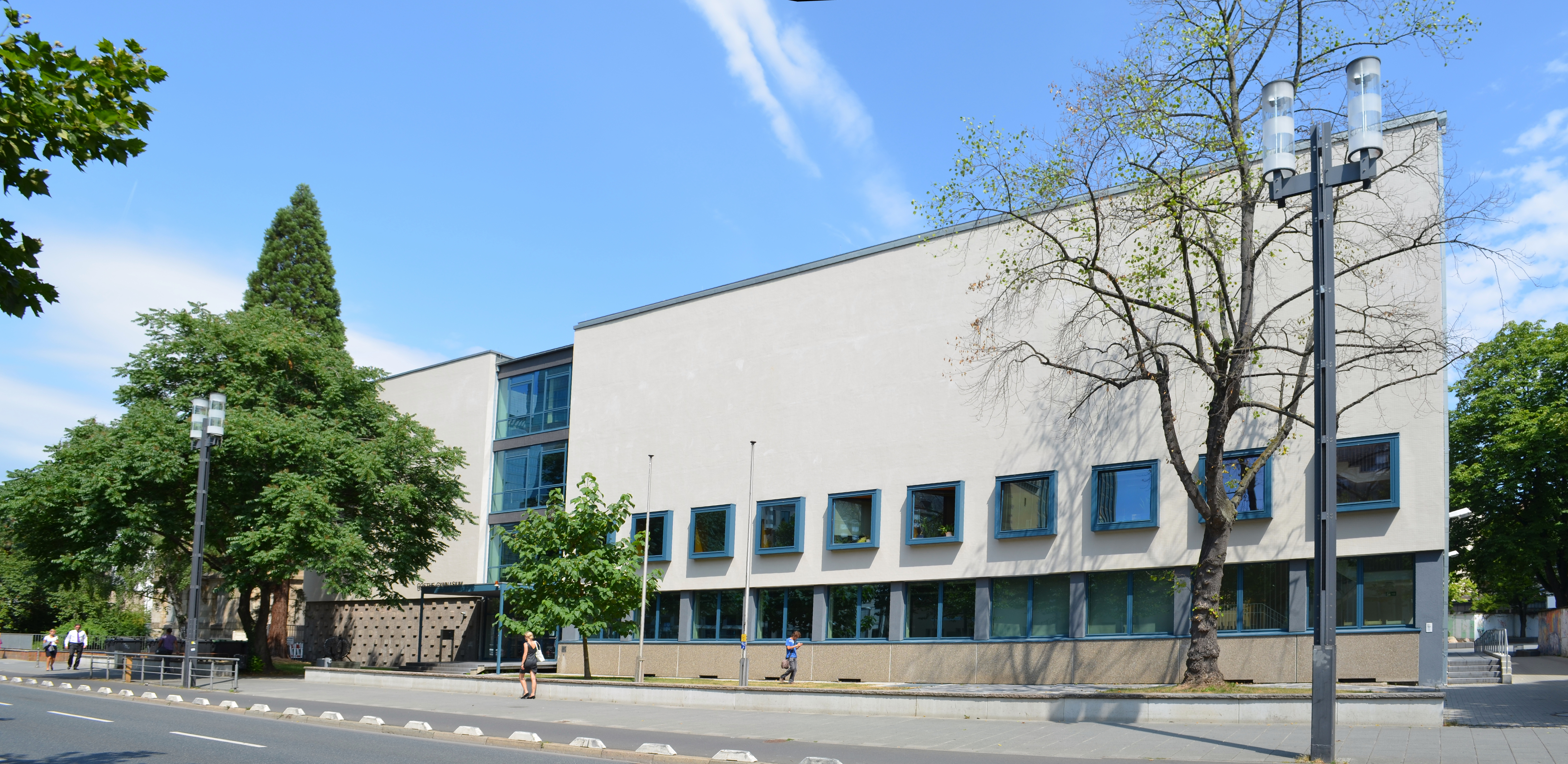

Location
- Frankfurt; Germany

Information
- School type: Gymnasium
- Established: 1520; 505 years ago
- Language: German; English
- Website: https://gg-ffm.de/

Goethe-Gymnasium is a gymnasium (secondary school) named after notable Frankfurt native Johann Wolfgang von Goethe (1749–1832). It is situated in the Westend of the city of Frankfurt am Main in Germany, near the Hauptbahnhof.

It is currently the only state funded school in Germany that offers students the option of taking International Baccalaureate examinations.

The Goethe-Gymnasium offers Japanese as a third foreign language, which is rare in Germany.

== History ==
The Städtisches Gymnasium was founded in 1520, and split into the Goethe-Gymnasium and the Lessing-Gymnasium in 1897. Thus, both schools descend directly from the city's oldest school.

The school building was severely damaged by bombing in 1944. The new building designed by the architects Zitter and Kempf was dedicated in 1959.

In 1969, the Goethe-Gymnasium became the first school in Hesse to offer bilingual lessons in German and English.

== Curriculum ==
Students can study numerous languages, including English, French, Latin, Russian and Japanese. The bilingual stream offers additional subjects taught in English, such as history, geography, philosophy, biology and social sciences. Further, students can choose to study Latin or French at the same time as English, beginning in grade 5, which is exceptional among state-funded secondary schools in Germany.

The Goethe-Gymnasium has been an International Baccalaureate World School since January 1972. Students can choose to take IB exams in addition to the traditional Abitur.

Students can join the school's choir, chamber choir, flute orchestra, and two symphony orchestras.

The school owns a cottage in Oberreifenberg, the Taunus mountain range, and it is a tradition for students to spend a week there twice a year. The school's orchestras spend their intense rehearsal periods there and final year students go there to study for their exams.

== School exchange visits ==
The Goethe-Gymnasium operates a program of exchange visits with partner schools in the following countries:

- United Kingdom (Anglo European School, Ingatestone)
- France
- United States
- Russia
- Japan
- India
- Kosovo
- Morocco

== Notable alumni ==
- Hans Bethe, physicist
- Michel Friedman, politician
- Richard Goldschmidt, geneticist
- Erich Klibansky, headmaster
- Thor Kunkel, author
- Kurt Lipstein, legal scholar
- Leo Löwenthal, sociologist
- Richard Plant, professor of German and author
- Christine Schäfer, soprano
- Britta Böhler, lawyer and member of the Dutch Senate
