= Lessing-Gymnasium, Frankfurt =

Coordinates: 50°07′31″N 8°40′20″E

Lessing-Gymnasium
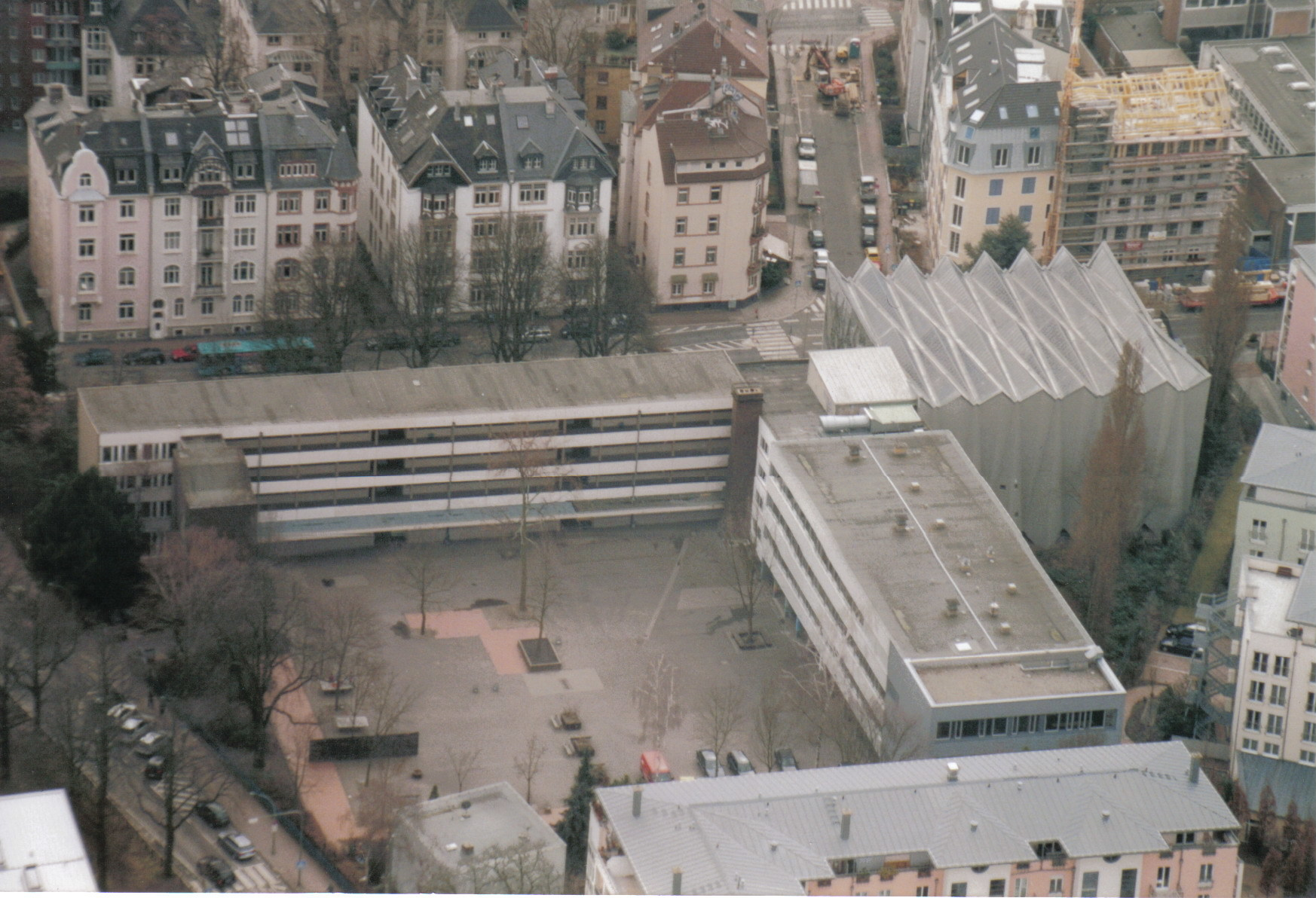
- Aerial view of the school
- Frankfurt; Germany

Information
- Established: 1519; 507 years ago
- Website: www.lessing-ffm.de

The Lessing-Gymnasium (together with its twin school Goethe-Gymnasium) is the oldest Gymnasium in Frankfurt. Named after Gotthold Ephraim Lessing, it was founded in 1519 by the city council.

In 2015 there was a controversy over this school refusing admission to students who were moving up from primary school and who were trying to gain admission to top Frankfurt secondary schools. The headmaster argued that secondary schools have the right to admit the students they desire.

== Curriculum ==
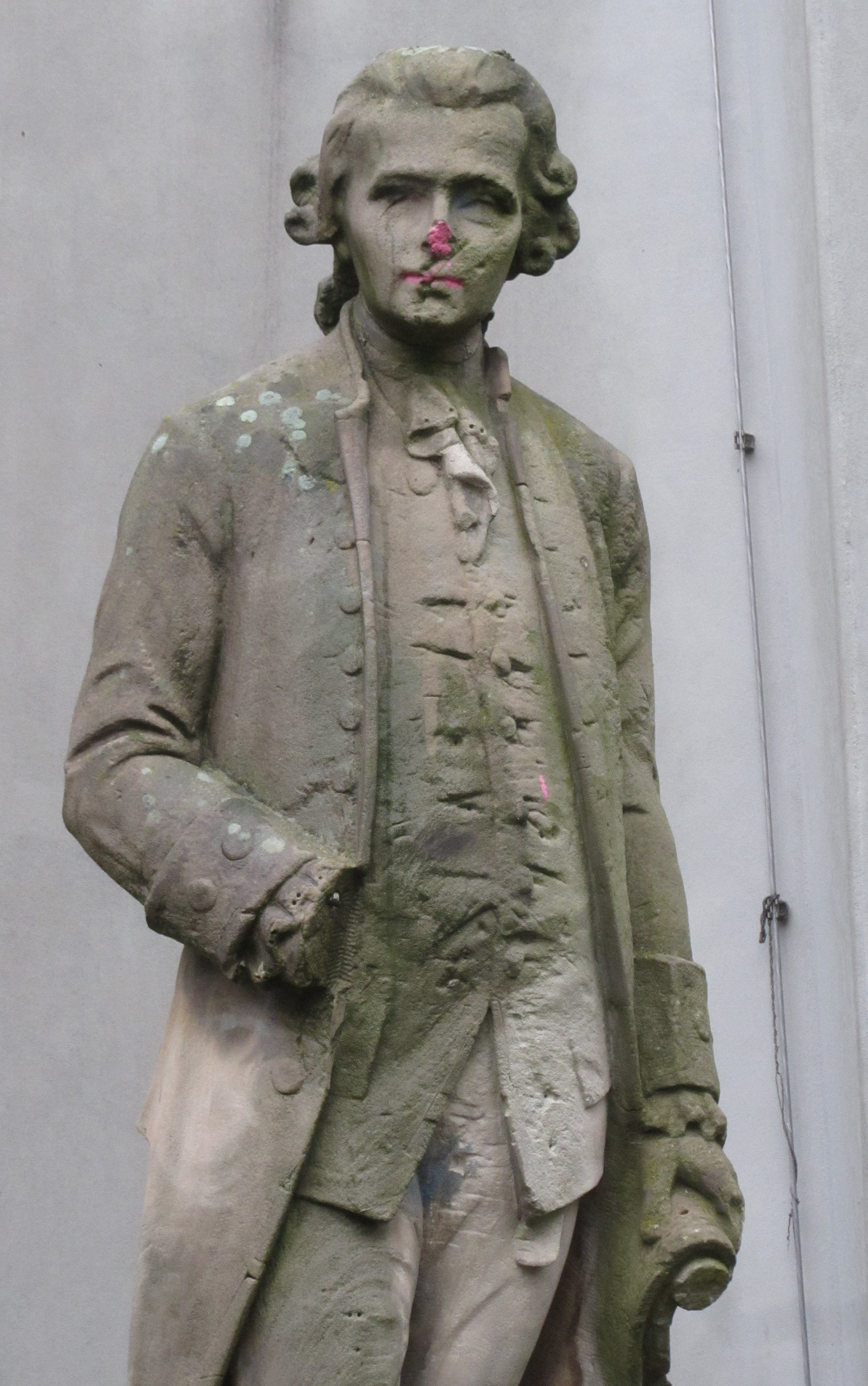
Statue of Gotthold Ephraim Lessing at the school

The first foreign languages are Latin and English starting in 5th grade. In the 8th grade the pupils have to choose between French or Ancient Greek. The school also has several orchestras and choirs.

== Notable alumni ==
Notable alumni of the Lessing-Gymnasium include:

- Georg Philipp Telemann, Baroque composer
- Friedrich Klausing, Nazi resistance fighter and one of the 20 July Plotters
- Gustav Koerner, German-American politician
- Georg Friedrich Grotefend
- Peter Stein
- Karl Schwarzschild
- Florian Henckel von Donnersmarck
- Boris Rhein
