= Neuwied (district) =

Coordinates: 50°30′N 7°30′E

- District
- Flag Coat of arms
- Country: Germany
- State: Rhineland-Palatinate
- Capital: Neuwied

Government
  - District admin.: Achim Hallerbach (CDU)

Area
  - Total: 626.80 km^{2} (242.01 sq mi)

Population (31 December 2025)
  - Total: 189,146
  - Density: 301.76/km^{2} (781.57/sq mi)
- Time zone: UTC+01:00 (CET)
  - Summer (DST): UTC+02:00 (CEST)
- Vehicle registration: NR
- Website: kreis-neuwied.de

Neuwied (German pronunciation: [nɔʏˈviːt]) is a district (Kreis) in the north of Rhineland-Palatinate, Germany. Neighboring districts are (from north clockwise) Rhein-Sieg, Altenkirchen, Westerwaldkreis, Mayen-Koblenz, Ahrweiler.

== History ==
The district was created in 1816 when the area became part of the Prussian Rhine province. In 1822 the district Linz was merged into the district.

The district has a partnership with the Polish county Namysłów in Opole Voivodeship; first contacts date to 1998 and the partnership became official in 2000.

== Geography ==
The districts landscape covers the Westerwald mountains, east of the Rhine river valley. The Rhine forms the western boundary of the district.

== Coat of arms ==
The crosses in the top represent the two clerical states which owned part of the district - the black cross of Cologne in the left, the red cross of Trier in the right. The peacock in the bottom is taken from the coat of arms of the Counts of Wied.

== Towns and municipalities ==
Clickable map of towns and municipalities in the district

Verband-free town: Neuwied

Verbandsgemeinden
1. Asbach; 1. Asbach^{1}; 2. Buchholz; 3. Neustadt (Wied); 4. Windhagen; 2. Bad Hönningen; 1. Bad Hönningen^{1, 2}; 2. Hammerstein; 3. Leutesdorf; 4. Rheinbrohl; 3. Dierdorf; 1. Dierdorf^{1, 2}; 2. Großmaischeid; 3. Isenburg; 4. Kleinmaischeid; 5. Marienhausen; 6. Stebach	4. Linz am Rhein; 1. Dattenberg; 2. Kasbach-Ohlenberg; 3. Leubsdorf; 4. Linz am Rhein^{1, 2}; 5. Ockenfels; 6. Sankt Katharinen; 7. Vettelschoß; 5. Puderbach; 1. Dernbach; 2. Döttesfeld; 3. Dürrholz; 4. Hanroth; 5. Harschbach; 6. Linkenbach; 7. Niederhofen; 8. Niederwambach; 9. Oberdreis; 10. Puderbach^{1}; 11. Ratzert; 12. Raubach; 13. Rodenbach bei Puderbach; 14. Steimel; 15. Urbach; 16. Woldert	6. Rengsdorf-Waldbreitbach; 1. Anhausen; 2. Bonefeld; 3. Breitscheid; 4. Datzeroth; 5. Ehlscheid; 6. Hardert; 7. Hausen (Wied); 8. Hümmerich; 9. Kurtscheid; 10. Meinborn; 11. Melsbach; 12. Niederbreitbach; 13. Oberhonnefeld-Gierend; 14. Oberraden; 15. Rengsdorf^{1}; 16. Roßbach; 17. Rüscheid; 18. Straßenhaus; 19. Thalhausen; 20. Waldbreitbach	7. Unkel; 1. Bruchhausen; 2. Erpel; 3. Rheinbreitbach; 4. Unkel^{1, 2}
^{1}seat of the Verbandsgemeinde; ^{2}town

== Transport ==
Verkehrsverbund Rhein-Mosel (VRM)

In the Neuwied district there are following railway lines:

- East Rhine railway, in service for freight and passenger trains (RB27, RE8)
- Neuwied–Koblenz railway (via Urmitz Rhine bridge, in service primarily for passenger trains (RB10)
- Neuwied-Augustenthal railway, out of service
- Engers-Au railway (Engers - Siershahn section (Brexbach Valley railway), reactivation for passenger transport in plan, Siershahn - Selters - Flammersfeld - Altenkirchen section (Holzbach Valley railway), in service for freight trains
- Kasbach Valley railway (Linz (Rhine) - Flammersfeld station) in Seelbach near Altenkirchen, in use for touristic special trains from Linz to Kalenborn
- Rheinbrohl - Malberg railway, out of service

Neuwied district is a member of the public transport association Verkehrsverbund Rhein-Mosel (VRM) as well as the fare of the Rheinland-Tarif (former Verkehrsverbund Rhein-Sieg fare) for railway rides that have start or end in the area of the Rheinland-Tarif.
