= Buchholz, Neuwied =

Buchholz
- Municipality
- Coat of arms

- Location of Buchholz within Neuwied district
- Interactive map of Buchholz
- Location within Germany Location within Rhineland-Palatinate
- Coordinates: 50°41′22″N 7°23′39″E
- Country: Germany
- State: Rhineland-Palatinate
- District: Neuwied
- Municipal assoc.: Asbach
- Subdivisions: 22

Government
  - Mayor (2019–24): Konrad Peuling (CDU)

Area
  - Total: 20.62 km^{2} (7.96 sq mi)
- Elevation: 259 m (850 ft)

Population (2025-12-31)
  - Total: 4,711
  - Density: 228.5/km^{2} (591.7/sq mi)
- Time zone: UTC+01:00 (CET)
  - Summer (DST): UTC+02:00 (CEST)
- Postal codes: 53567
- Dialling codes: 02683, 02248
- Vehicle registration: NR
- Website: www.vg-asbach.de

Buchholz (German pronunciation: [ˈbuːxhɔlts]) is a municipality in the district of Neuwied, in Rhineland-Palatinate, Germany.
