= Puderbach =

- Municipality
- Coat of arms

- Location of Puderbach within Neuwied district
- Interactive map of Puderbach
- Location within Germany Location within Rhineland-Palatinate
- Coordinates: 50°35′53″N 7°36′46″E
- Country: Germany
- State: Rhineland-Palatinate
- District: Neuwied
- Municipal assoc.: Puderbach
- Subdivisions: 5

Government
  - Mayor (2019–24): Manfred Pees (CDU)

Area
  - Total: 11.02 km^{2} (4.25 sq mi)
- Elevation: 240 m (790 ft)

Population (2025-12-31)
  - Total: 2,562
  - Density: 232.5/km^{2} (602.1/sq mi)
- Time zone: UTC+01:00 (CET)
  - Summer (DST): UTC+02:00 (CEST)
- Postal codes: 56305
- Dialling codes: 02684
- Vehicle registration: NR
- Website: www.gemeinde-puderbach.de

Puderbach (German pronunciation: [ˈpuːdɐbax]) is a municipality in the district of Neuwied, in Rhineland-Palatinate, Germany. It is situated in the Westerwald, approx. 25 km north of Koblenz.

Puderbach is the seat of the Verbandsgemeinde ("collective municipality") Puderbach.

== Transport ==
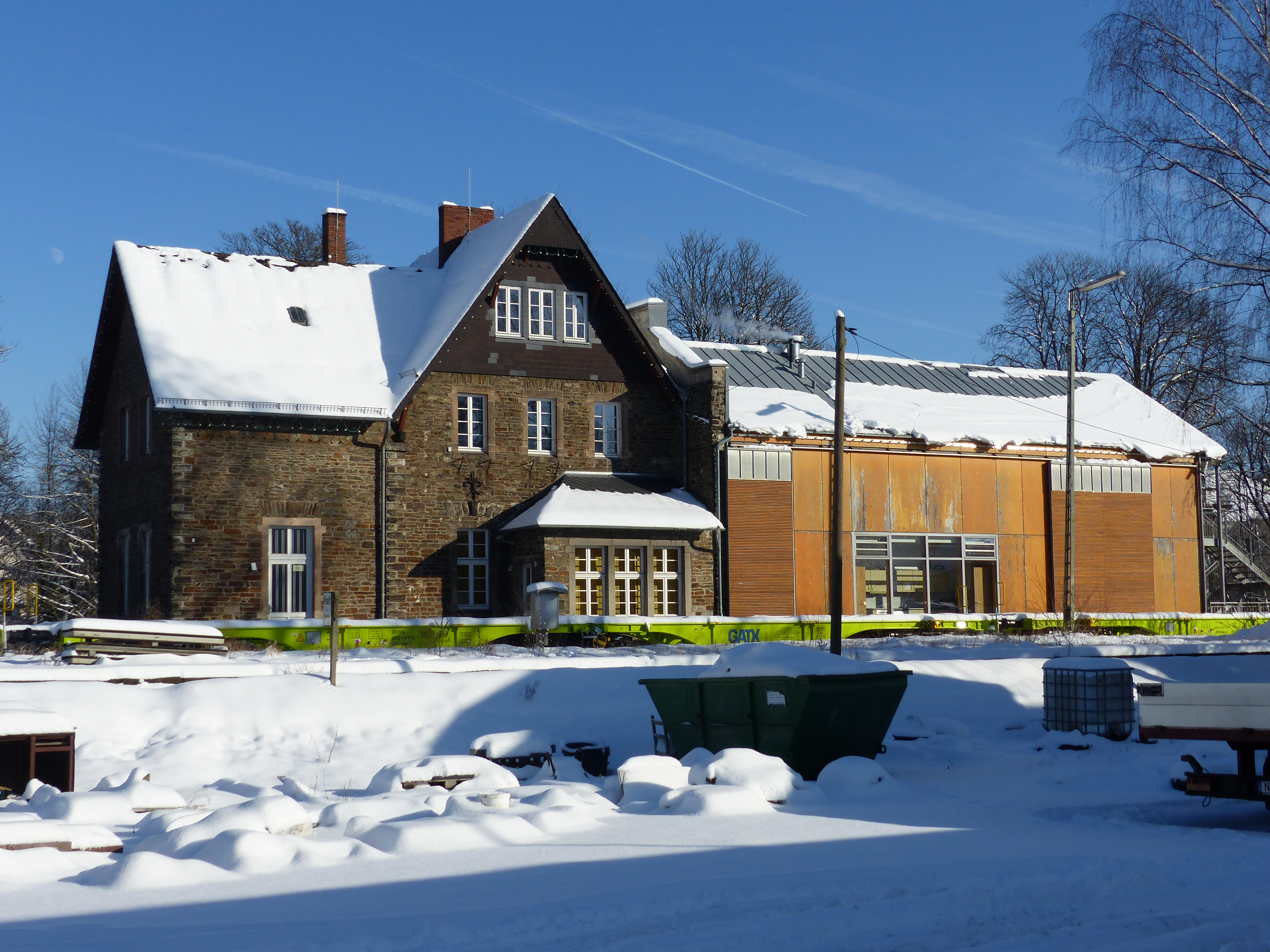
The former Puderbach train station

Puderbach is located on the Engers-Au railway line, the service of passenger trains has discounted on the section between Siershahn and Altenkirchen. Nowadays the nearest train stations are Siershahn and Altenkirchen. The local bus lines 100, 101, 102, 103, 105, 108, 114, 115 and 121 serve Puderbach, Puderbach is located in the area of the transport association Verkehrsverbund Rhein-Mosel, zone number 230.

== Twin towns ==
Puderbach is twinned with:

- Barenton, France, since 1970
