= Steimel =

- Municipality
- Coat of arms

- Location of Steimel within Neuwied district
- Interactive map of Steimel
- Location within Germany Location within Rhineland-Palatinate
- Coordinates: 50°37′04″N 07°37′40″E
- Country: Germany
- State: Rhineland-Palatinate
- District: Neuwied
- Municipal assoc.: Puderbach

Government
  - Mayor (2019–24): Wolfgang Theis

Area
  - Total: 5.59 km^{2} (2.16 sq mi)
- Elevation: 326 m (1,070 ft)

Population (2025-12-31)
  - Total: 1,300
  - Density: 230/km^{2} (600/sq mi)
- Time zone: UTC+01:00 (CET)
  - Summer (DST): UTC+02:00 (CEST)
- Postal codes: 57614
- Dialling codes: 02684
- Vehicle registration: NR
- Website: www.puderbach.de

Steimel (German pronunciation: [ˈʃtaɪml̩]) is a small town in the district of Neuwied, in Rhineland-Palatinate, Germany.
