= Missionaries of St. John the Baptist =

Catholic religious institutes and associations honoring Saint John the Baptist

The name Missionaries of St. John the Baptist refers to three separate Roman Catholic associations under the patronage of Saint John the Baptist. The first was a relatively short-lived congregation of priests founded by Don Dominic Francis Olivieri in the eighteenth century to preach parish missions, mostly in Italy. The second is a congregation founded in 1948 by Johannes Haw in Leutesdorf, Germany. They remain active in Germany, Portugal, Mozambique and India. The third is an Association of the Faithful located in Park Hills, Kentucky, founded by two former members of the Fathers of Mercy to promote the Latin Mass.

== Missionary Priests of St. John the Baptist ==
In 1730, Giovanna Maria Baptista Solimani founded the Hermit Sisters of St. John the Baptist (or "Baptistines") at Moneglia, not far from Genoa. The group intended to lead a life of penitence as a cloistered community. Don Dominic Francis Olivieri was Solimani's spiritual advisor. In 1744, Solimani traveled to Rome and with the aid of Barnabite Mario Maccabei obtained the approval of Pope Benedict XIV.

The congregation of Missionary Priests of St. John the Baptist, called Baptistines, was founded by a Genoese, Domenico Olivieri. He began by forming an association of priests who would devote their time especially to missions. The idea was encouraged by Cardinal Spinola and the concept afterwards received the approbation of Pope Benedict XIV. The pope confirmed the new congregation in his Brief of 23 September 1755, and placed it under the control of the Cardinal Prefect of the Propaganda Fide.

The institute had a house and an oratory at Rome near the church of St. Isidoro, and the members held missions in the different churches of the city and in the surrounding countryside. As the Congregation wished to employ them in distant missions, a number of them were sent to Bulgaria, Macedonia, and China; some became bishops. Foreign missions did not absorb all their activity, for a number were employed in the service of the Church in Italy, two, Imperiali and Spinelli becoming cardinals. The only vows imposed by the founder were those of continuance in the congregation and readiness to go to missions to which the members should be sent by the Congregation. Olivieri died at Genoa on 13 June 1766. The society disappeared during the troubles which overwhelmed Italy at the end of the eighteenth century.

== Society of Missionaries of Saint John the Baptist ==
The Society of Missionaries of Saint John the Baptist was founded by Johannes Haw in Leutesdorf, Germany. The community is present in Portugal, Mozambique and India. They work in social services, caring for the aged, the homeless, and for homeless and released prisoners. They also have a press apostolate and conduct retreats.

== Missionaries of Saint John the Baptist ==
The "Missionaries of Saint John the Baptist" was a Public Association of the Faithful recognized in the Roman Catholic Diocese of Covington. It was founded by two former members of the Fathers of Mercy with the aim of establishing a new religious Institute of diocesan right which celebrates the liturgy according to the 1962 Roman Missal, the Tridentine Mass. The association operated Our Lady of Lourdes parish in Park Hills, Kentucky. Bishop John Iffert suppressed the Missionaries in 2024 and removed most of the faculties of its priest members.

== See also ==
- Hermits of St. John the Baptist
