= Baptistines =

Baptistines was the name given to several Roman Catholic religious institutes dedicated to Saint John the Baptist:

- Hermits of St. John the Baptist, founded about 1630 by Michel de Saint-Sabine in France who reformed and united the hermits of various dioceses.
- Missionaries of St. John the Baptist founded by a Genoese, Domenico Olivieri, who united several priests with himself for the evangelization of the people of the towns and countryside.
- The Sisterhood of St. John the Baptist, or Hermit Sisters of St. John the Baptist, were founded by Giovanna Maria Baptista Solimani in 1730 at Moneglia.
- The Sisters of St. John the Baptist is a female religious institute, founded in Angri in 1876.
