= Fahr (Neuwied) =

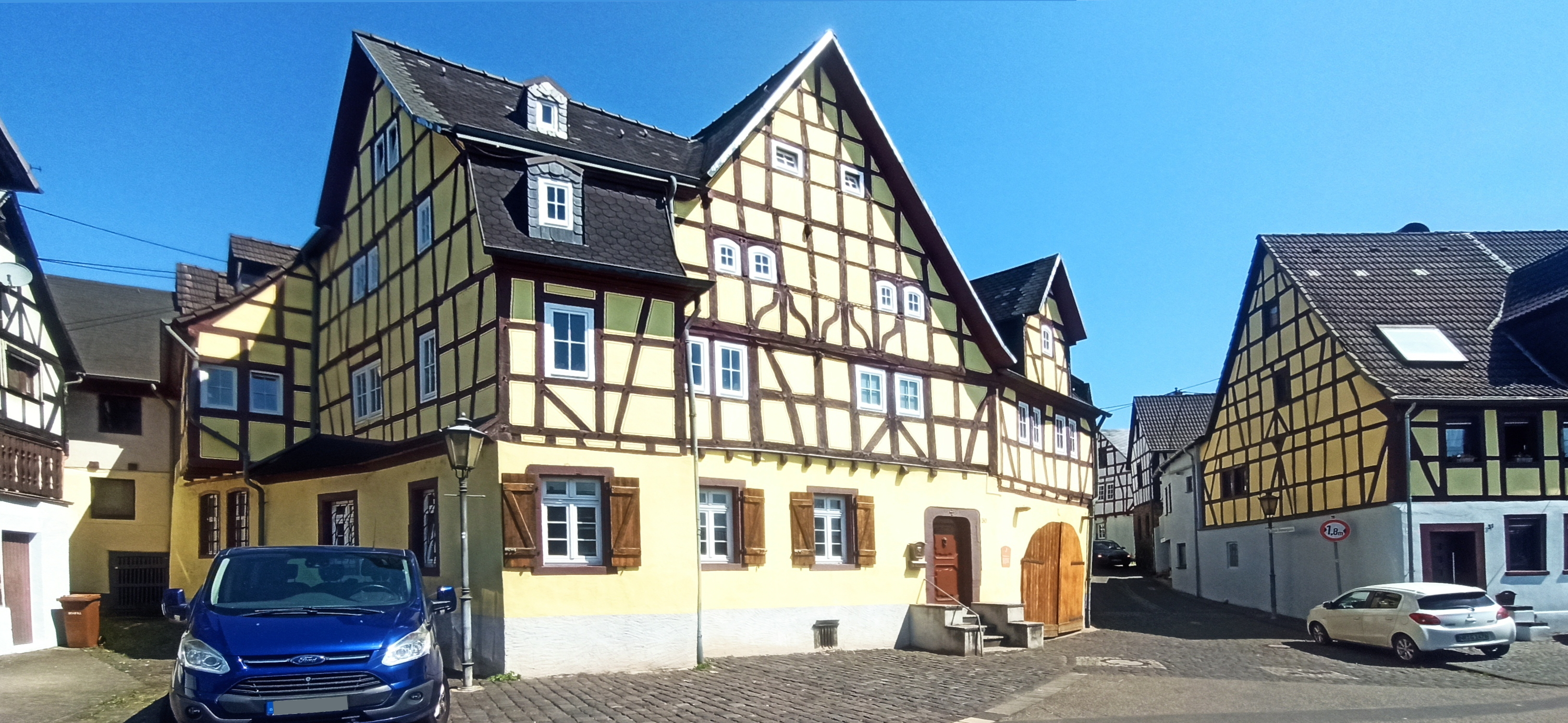
Rhenish house in Fahr, June 2025

The ancient village of Fahr bordering the Rhine river is today part of the Feldkirchen district belonging to the town of Neuwied in northern Rhineland-Palatinate, Germany. The name probably came from the old name Vare or Uff Fähr in local dialect, which relates to today's German word Fähre (English: ferry).

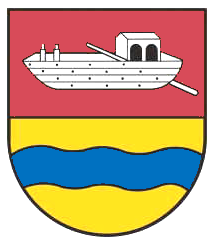
Coat of arms of Fahr

== Geography ==
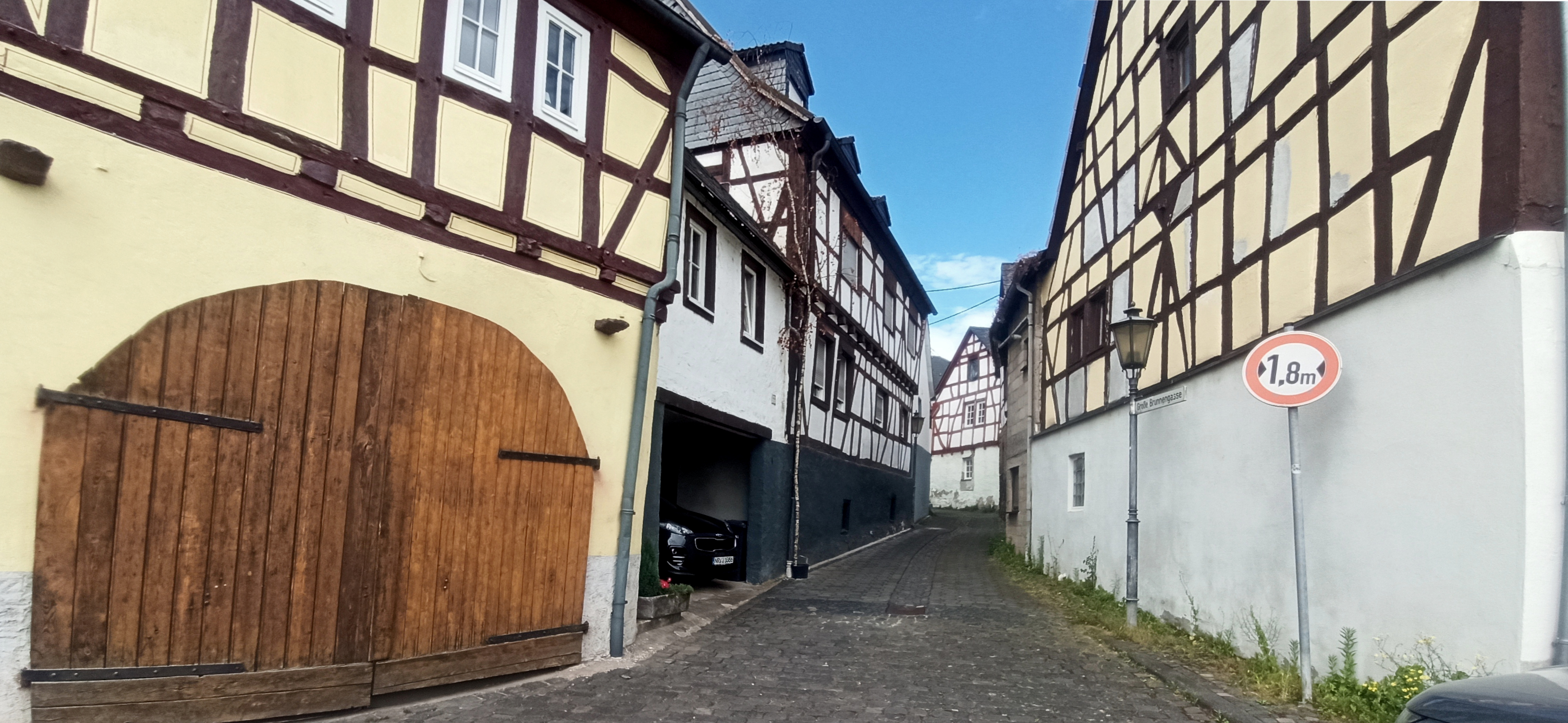
Narrow Street Große Brunnengasse, July 2024

The former village is located directly on the right bank of the Rhine, with two ancient streets, the Große Brunnengasse and the Fahrer Straße, both rising from the historic village center on the river bank to the first hills of the Westerwald mountain range. A small natural harbor had formed on the slope on which Fahr is located. Today the two single-lane roads still lead through the village, the Große Brunnengasse can only be passed by smaller cars.

The Fahrer Straße was previously called Hohl (hollow path) and today still corresponds to the course of the ancient Roman road, which in Roman times led from the Roman fort Niederbieber to the Rhine at Fahr, as there was a crossing or ferry to the left river side (to the settlement of Andernach).

As the Fahr area was surrounded by steep hills falling down to the river, the Fahrer Strasse was the only land connection to the village until the 19th century.

A first road running along the river downstream toward the village of Leutesdorf was laid out in 1813. Because of the rocks east of Fahr, the upstream road towards Neuwied was only built during the second half of the 19th century, together with the construction of the railway.

== History ==
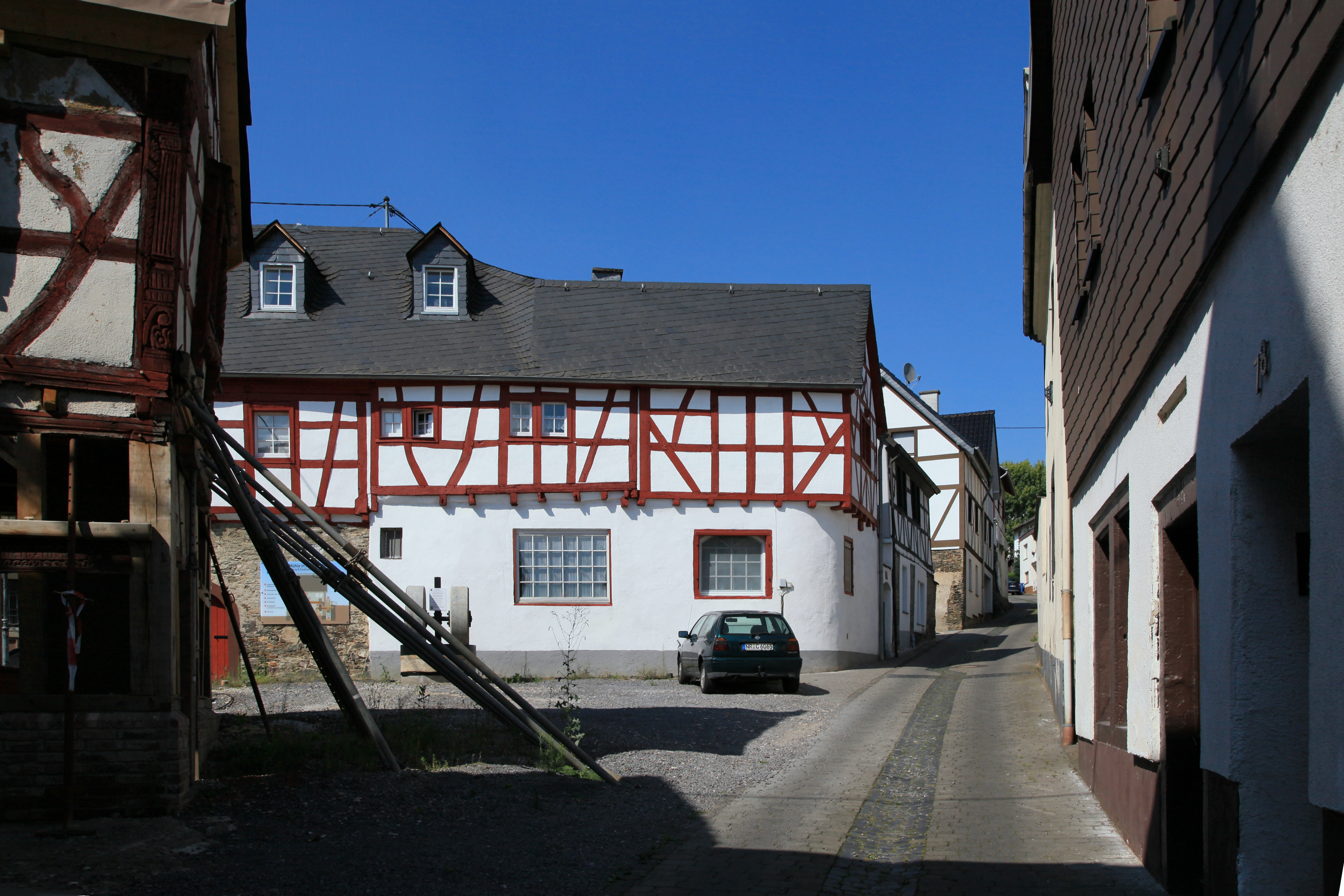
Street Fahrer Straße in Fahr

Originally, most of the inhabitants of Fahr earned their living on fishing and ferry services for centuries, and their houses were only accessible via footpaths.

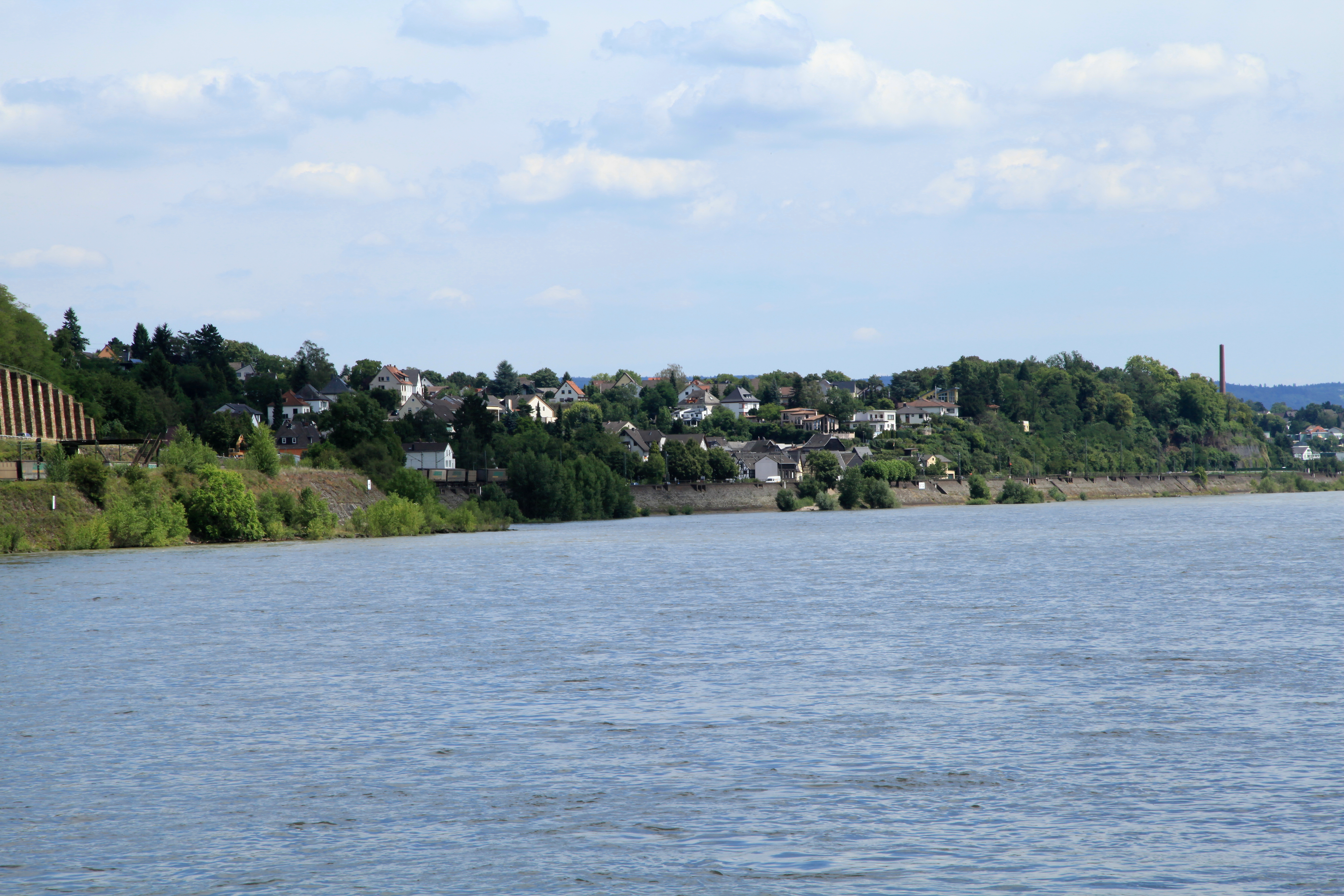
Fahr seen from across the Rhine river

Fahr was first mentioned as a river crossing point in 1152 called Vare or Uff Fähr in local Low German. Around 1190, the St. Thomas monastery from Andernach acquired arable and wine-growing land of Fahr. At that time, wine was grown on the hills of Fahr. The village had ferry rights for several hundred years, and many residents were active in shipping.

There has been a castle called Schloss Friedrichstein, built by the County of Wied during the 17th century on the rocky river banks east of Fahr. In 1869 the remains of the castle were demolished for construction of the railway line.

One of the old houses in Fahr still standing today and facing the river is the Rheinisches Haus (Rhenish house) built in 1584 as a Ferryman's house, later also used as a changing station for towpath horses, and also as Gasthaus. The building has been restored by its current owner.

Since July 14, 2001, the historic village center with its half-timbered houses has been protected as cultural heritage.

The Moskopf family's vinegar and mustard factory, founded in 1836, still existed in Fahr until 1998. The factory had been operated by Carl Kühne KG since 1948. The largest company on the territory of Fahr is Lohmann & Rauscher medical devices since 1899.

== Community mergers ==
In 1966, the previously independent village of Fahr was merged with neighboring municipalities to form a large community under the historical name Feldkirchen. Later, in 1970, Feldkirchen was dissolved and assigned to the town of Neuwied. Fahr thus came to the city of Neuwied as part of the Feldkirchen district.

== Notable people ==
- The origin of the Rockefeller family is traced back to Goddard Rockenfeller, born in Fahr in 1590. His grandson Johann Peter (1682–1763) and his great-grandson Johann Thiell (1695–1769) emigrated with their families to New Jersey and New York where they called themselves Rockefeller. The family name relates to the village of Rockenfeld (today abandoned) which lies on higher grounds at a footpath distance of about 7 km (4.3 mi) from Fahr.
- August von Röntgen (1781–1865), German lawyer and diplomat, second son of the Neuwied cabinet maker David Roentgen, built Villa Roentgen, later also called Haus Friedrichstein, above Friedrichstein Castle in 1847.
