= Am Forsthofweg =

Coordinates: 50°29′39″N 7°23′38″E

The castellum or small fort nowadays called Am Forsthofweg was a Roman military camp of the Upper Germanic-Rhaetian Limes. It received UNESCO World Heritage status in 2005.

== Geography ==
The fortification was located in the area of the current Bad Hönningen association of municipalities within the district of Neuwied in Rhineland-Palatinate, Germany. The place can be found in today's forest of Hammerstein, away from closed settlement areas. A good half a kilometer north of the site is the deserted village of Rockenfeld.

Ancient roads led to this place in prehistoric times. Some of them ran parallel to the Limes as high-altitude trails, some of them crossed it. The garrison of the fort was probably responsible for monitoring these traffic-geographical conditions.

== Archaeological exploration ==
The fort was discovered in 1894 under the direction of Heinrich Jacobi (1866–1946), the local section commissioner of the Imperial Limes Commission (Reichs-Limeskommission – RLK), and examined in two excavation campaigns in 1894 and 1901.

== Description ==
The Roman fortlet "Am Forsthofweg" is an almost square earthwork. With its side lengths of around 40 meters, it occupies an area of around 0.7 hectares.

A rampart and a ditch 5 meters wide and 1.5 meters deep served as a first defense line. With its only gate, the camp faced north, towards the Limes frontline.

A wooden construction of unknown function, covering around 45 square meters was found inside. The latter was disturbed in its north-western area by a medieval pit.

No final statements can be made about the beginning or the end date of the fort, neither about its occupants. It is assumed that its garrison was the vexillatio of a larger Roman auxiliary unit for monitoring a Limes crossing point that was discovered between its watchtowers Wp 13 and Wp 13a.

== Today ==
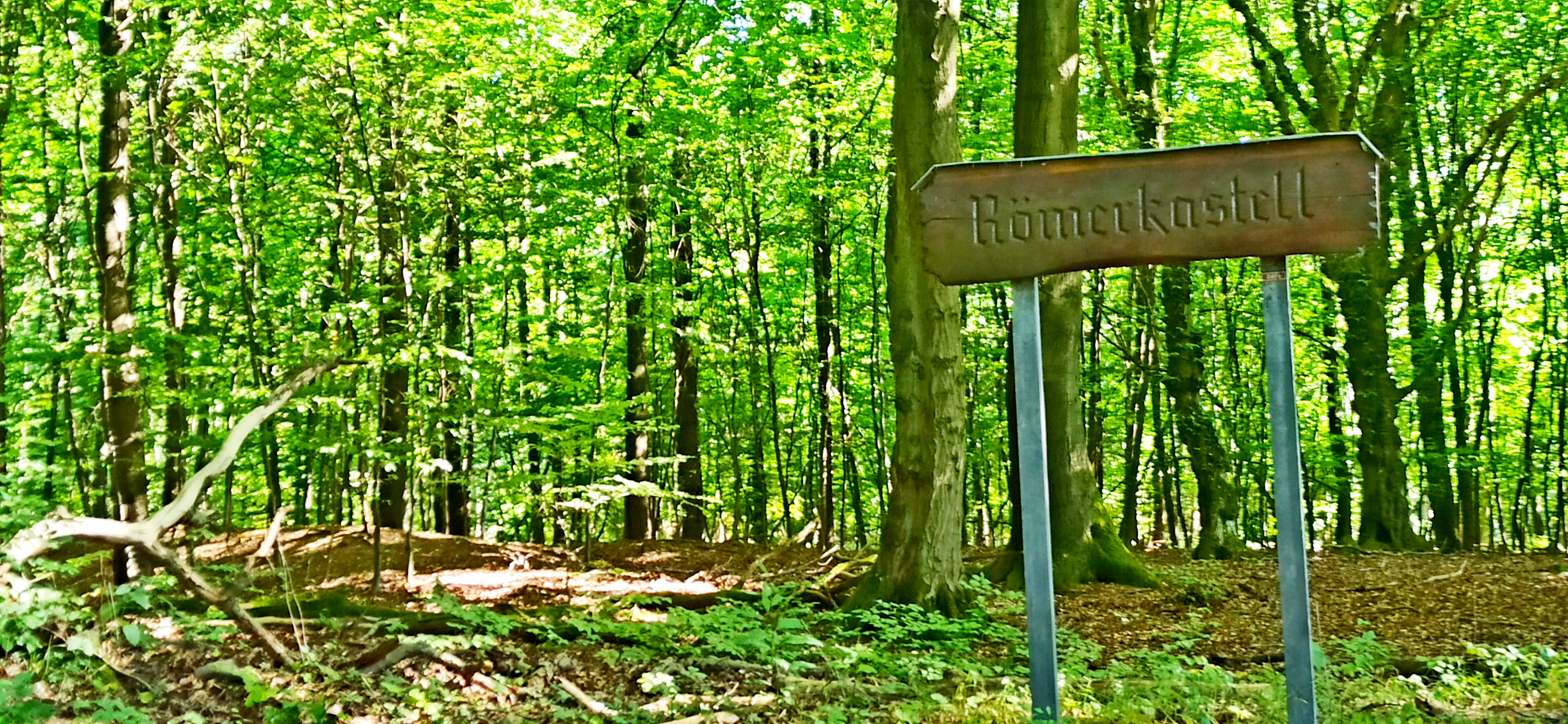
(2023)

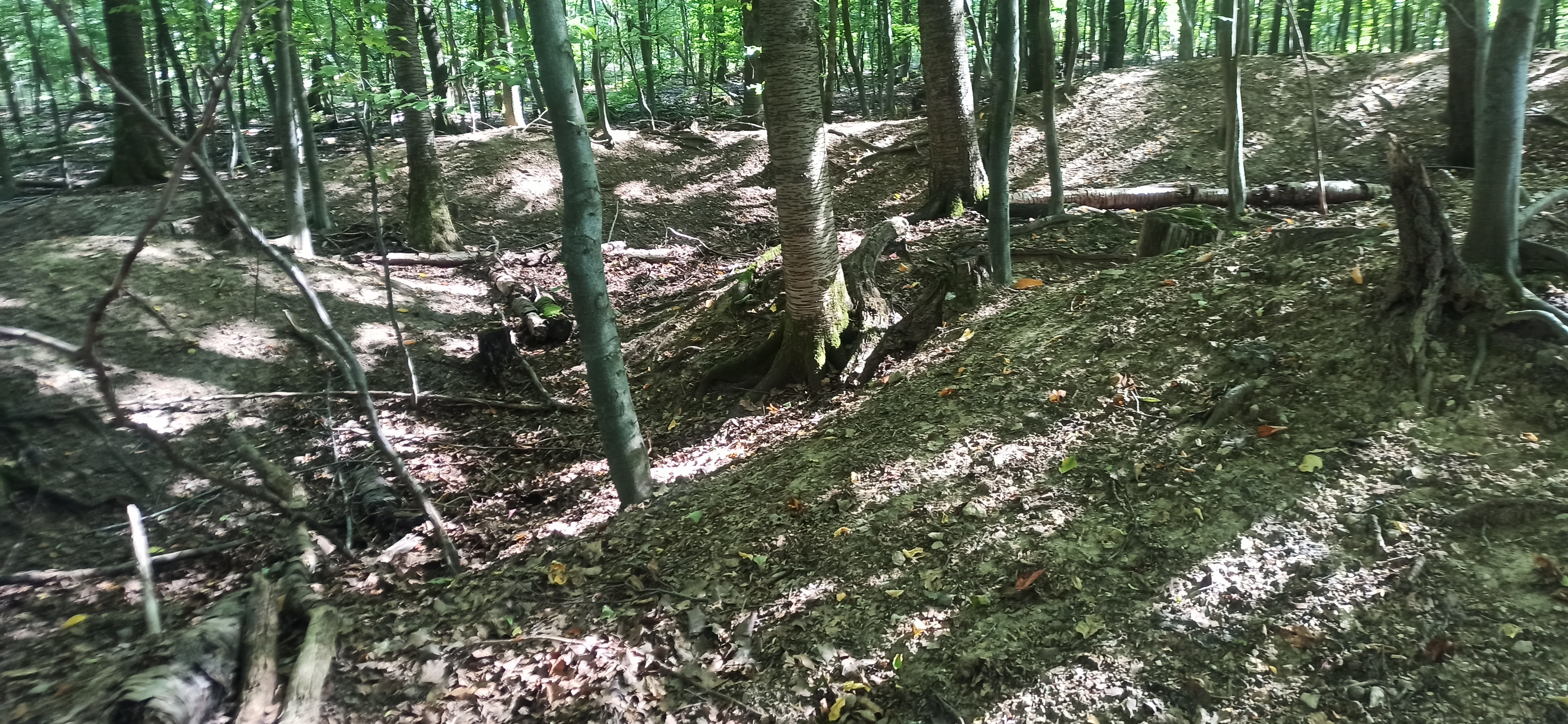
(2023)

The soil deformations caused by the rampart and ditch of the fort's defenses can still be clearly traced in the terrain today, although the ditch has flattened out considerably due to erosion and the rampart is only preserved up to a height of 1.20 m.

The small fort "Am Forsthofweg" as well as the other archaeological remains of the Upper Germanic-Rhaetian Limes Germanicus have been part of the UNESCO World Heritage since 2005. In addition, the facilities are cultural monuments according to the Monument Protection Act of the State of Rhineland-Palatinate (DSchG). Research and targeted collection of finds are subject to approval. Accidental finds must be reported to the monument authorities.
