= Gönnersdorf, Neuwied =

Gönnersdorf
- Part of Neuwied
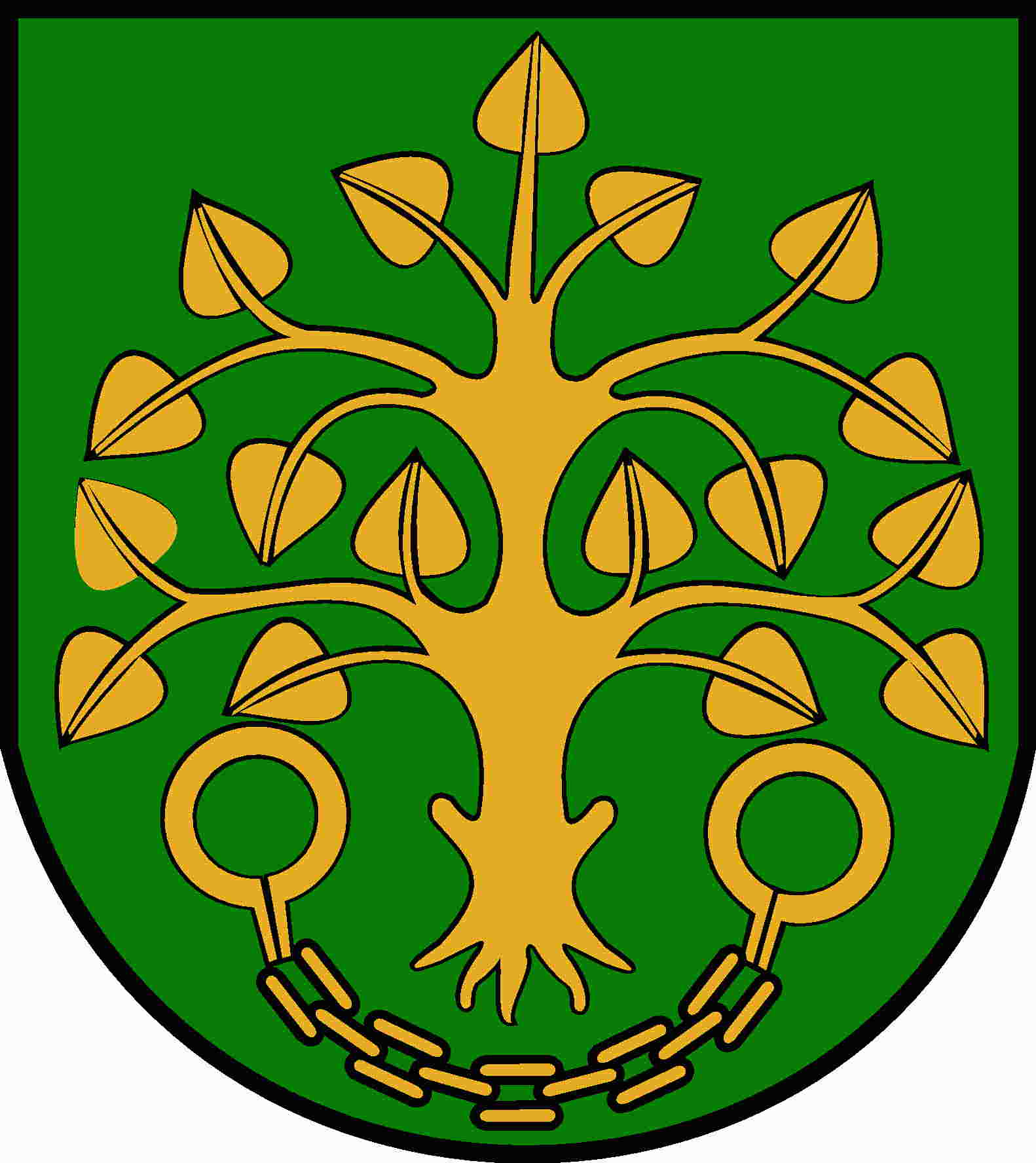
- Coat of arms
- Interactive map of Gönnersdorf
- Location within Germany Location within Rhineland-Palatinate
- Country: Germany
- State: Rhineland-Palatinate
- Admin. region: Koblenz
- District: Feldkirchen
- City: Neuwied
- Elevation: 115 m (377 ft)
- Time zone: UTC+01:00 (CET)
  - Summer (DST): UTC+02:00 (CEST)

The village of Gönnersdorf (German pronunciation: [ˈɡœnɐsdɔʁf]), Rhineland-Palatinate, Germany, extends on the hills north of the Rhine above the village of Fahr, which lies directly on the river. Gönnersdorf as well as Fahr are today part of the locality of Feldkirchen, itself incorporated into the town of Neuwied.

== History ==
The territory of the village of Gönnersdorf has been occupied by human beings since very remote times. In 1968 the remains of a hunting camp from the Upper Palaeolithic Age about 15,000 years ago were found there. This discovery was later explored by the prehistorian Gerhard Bosinski. The archaeological site of Gönnersdorf achieved worldwide fame, in particular for the art objects discovered, such as the engravings on slate plates or the figurines of Venus.

During the Roman Empire, the Upper Germanic Limes ran through the Gönnersdorf area from the end of the first to the middle of the third century. Its traces (wall, ditch and the mound of rubble from the former watchtowers) can still be traced in the terrain, it is accessible via the Limes hiking trail.

The court of Beunehof was first mentioned in a document in 1180 which at that time belonged to the burgraves of Hammerstein. After the male line became extinct at the beginning of the 15th century it was passed to the Electorate of Trier and later came into possession of the Principality of Wied. The few buildings on the property that have survived to this day are listed as cultural monuments under the Rhineland-Palatinate State's Monument Protection Act.

The remote hamlet of Rockenfeld belonged to Gönnersdorf until it separated in 1693.
