= Hammerschmidt =

Hammerschmidt (from German: Hammerschmied "smith of hammers") is a German surname. Notable people with the surname include:

- Andreas Hammerschmidt (1611–1675), German Bohemian composer
- Carl Eduard Hammerschmidt (1800–1874), Austrian mineralogist
- Ernst Hammerschmidt (1928–1993), Austrian / German scholar of Ethiopia
- Frank Hammerschmidt, clarinet maker
- John Paul Hammerschmidt (1922–2015), American politician
- Hildegard Hammerschmidt-Hummel (born 1944), German professor
- Maren Hammerschmidt (born 1989), German biathlete

== See also ==
- Hammerschmidt (disambiguation)
