= Karl Kuhn (disambiguation) =

Karl Kuhn or Kühn may refer to:

- Karl Gottlob Kühn (1754–1840), German medical doctor and medical historian
- Karl Kuhn (1897-1923), bystander killed in the Beer Hall Putsch
- Karl Kühn (1904–1986), Austrian cyclist
- Karl Kuhn (baseball) (born 1969), American baseball player and coach

== See also ==
- Carl Kühne KG, a German food manufacturer
- Charles the Bold (1433–1477), French Nobleman, called Karl der Kühne in German
