= Hammerstein (disambiguation) =

Hammerstein is a municipality in Germany.

Hammerstein may also refer to:

- Hammerstein (surname)
- Hammerstein (robot), a character in the comic 2000 AD
- Hammerstein Ballroom, a ballroom in New York City
- German name of Czarne, Poland

== See also ==
- Hammerstein castle
