= Hammerschmidt (disambiguation) =

Hammerschmidt is a German surname. It may also refer to:

== Places ==
- Hammerschmidt Villa, official residence of the German President
- Machet die Tore weit (Hammerschmidt), advent motel
- John Paul Hammerschmidt Federal Building, building in Arkansas
- John Paul Hammerschmidt Lake, reservoir on the Arkansas lake
- Hammerschmidt elementary school, school in Lombard, IL

== See also ==
- Hubert Hammerschmied, Austrian cross-country skier
- Hammerschlag
- Hammerstein (disambiguation)
