= Johannes Haw =

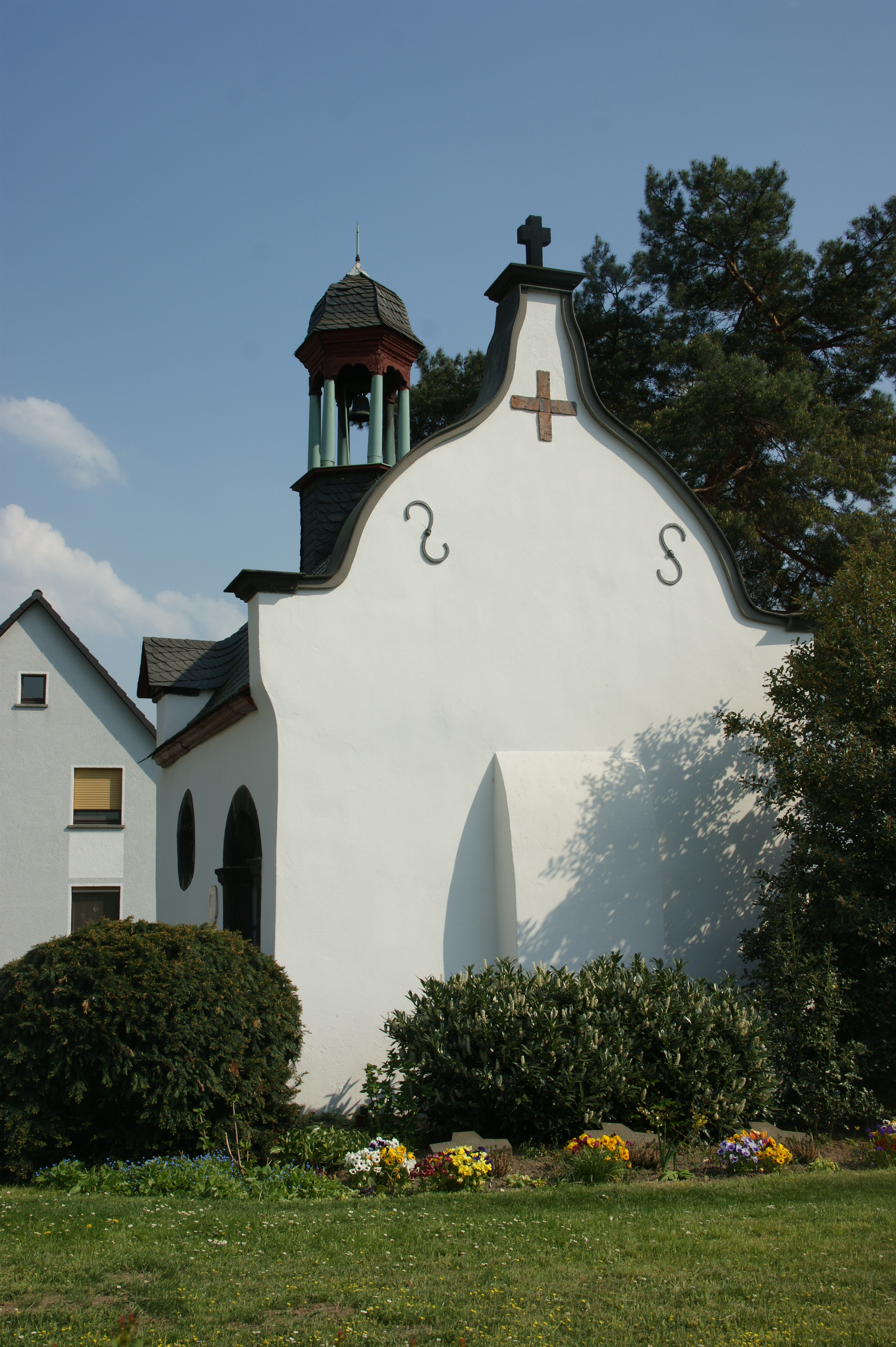
Chapel exterior

Johannes Maria Haw (26 May 1871 – 28 October 1949) was a German Roman Catholic priest and the founder of the Johannesbund of Leutesdorf and of the religious communities of the Community of the Sisters of St John of Mary the Queen (Ordensgemeinschaft der Johannesschwestern von Maria Königin) and the Society of Missionaries of Saint John the Baptist (die Gemeinschaft der Missionare vom Hl. Johannes dem Täufer).

== Biography ==
Johannes Haw was born in Schweich on the Moselle to Peter and Barbara Hoff Haw. His parents were farmers and vintners. Young Johannes suffered from poor health so the farming profession was never seriously considered for him. He graduated from the Friedrich Wilhelm High School in 1891. Among his classmates was Nikolaus Bares, future Bishop of Berlin.

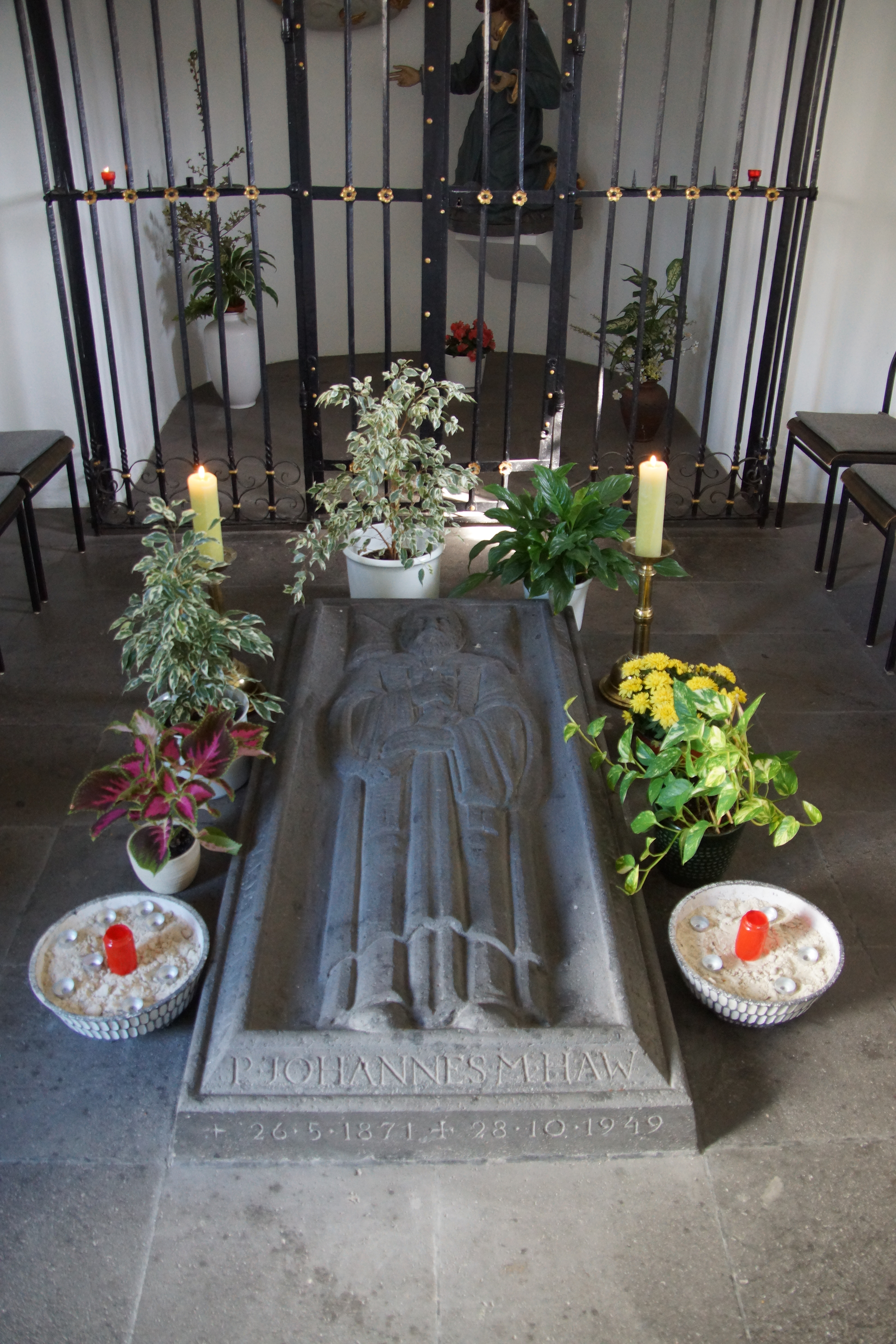
Grave of Johannes Haw in the Ölbergkapelle ("Chapel of the Mount of Olives")

He studied theology at the seminary in Trier and was ordained a priest on 30 March 1895 in Trier Cathedral by Bishop Michael Felix Korum. He was chaplain in the parish of Our Lady in Koblenz (1895–1897), vicar in Holz in Heusweiler (Saar) and later parish priest in Wintersdorf in Ralingen on the Sauer.

While working among the miners in Holz, he learned the devastating effects of alcoholism on families. Haw campaigned for pastoral support for those struggling with alcoholism. He became a leading figure in the anti-alcohol and temperance movement in Germany. In 1904 the bishop appointed him the diocesan representative of the Catholic Association of Temperance based in Trier. Shortly afterwards Fr. Haw became leader of the movement for the whole of Germany. Haw took a moderate course that did not consider total abstinence to be the only true path. This attitude was due in part to the fact that in the diocese of Trier the production of alcoholic beverages formed the livelihood for a large part of the population, sometimes also for monasteries.

In 1906, he become rector of the Irminen Hospital. In 1912 he went to Leutesdorf and acquired a house for groups of alcoholics. He gave retreats to these groups so that those who struggle with addiction to alcohol should also have some spiritual support.

The foundation of the "Johannesbund", a society of benefactors and lay assistants to his work, followed on 15 October 1919. In 1921 he started a magazine and opened in a printing press and publishing house. In 1933, the Gestapo searched the print shop for anti-subversive writings. In 1941 the community at Leutesdorf was classified as hostile to the state and dissolved; the property passed to the state.

After the war, Haw set about rebuilding. He died in Leutesdorf in 1949, where he is buried in the Ölbergkapelle ("Chapel of the Mount of Olives"). The process of beatification has begun.

== Legacy ==
Two religious orders arose from his efforts: the Community of the Sisters of St John of Mary the Queen (Ordensgemeinschaft der Johannesschwestern von Maria Königin) in 1928, and the Society of Missionaries of Saint John the Baptist (die Gemeinschaft der Missionare vom Hl. Johannes dem Täufer) in 1948. Both are based in Leutesdorf, but members are also active in Portugal, Mozambique and India. They work in social services, caring for the homeless, for homeless and released prisoners, and in old people's homes. They also have a press apostolate and conduct retreats.

There is a Johannes-Haw-Straße in his hometown of Schweich.

== Sources ==
- Schönhofen, Werner (2012): Pater Johannes Maria Haw. Lebenslauf des Ordensgründers und sein Wirken in Leutesdorf in Heimat-Jahrbuch Landkreis Neuwied 2012, pp. 284–289, ISBN 978-3-9814662-0-1
