= Bad Hönningen =

- Town
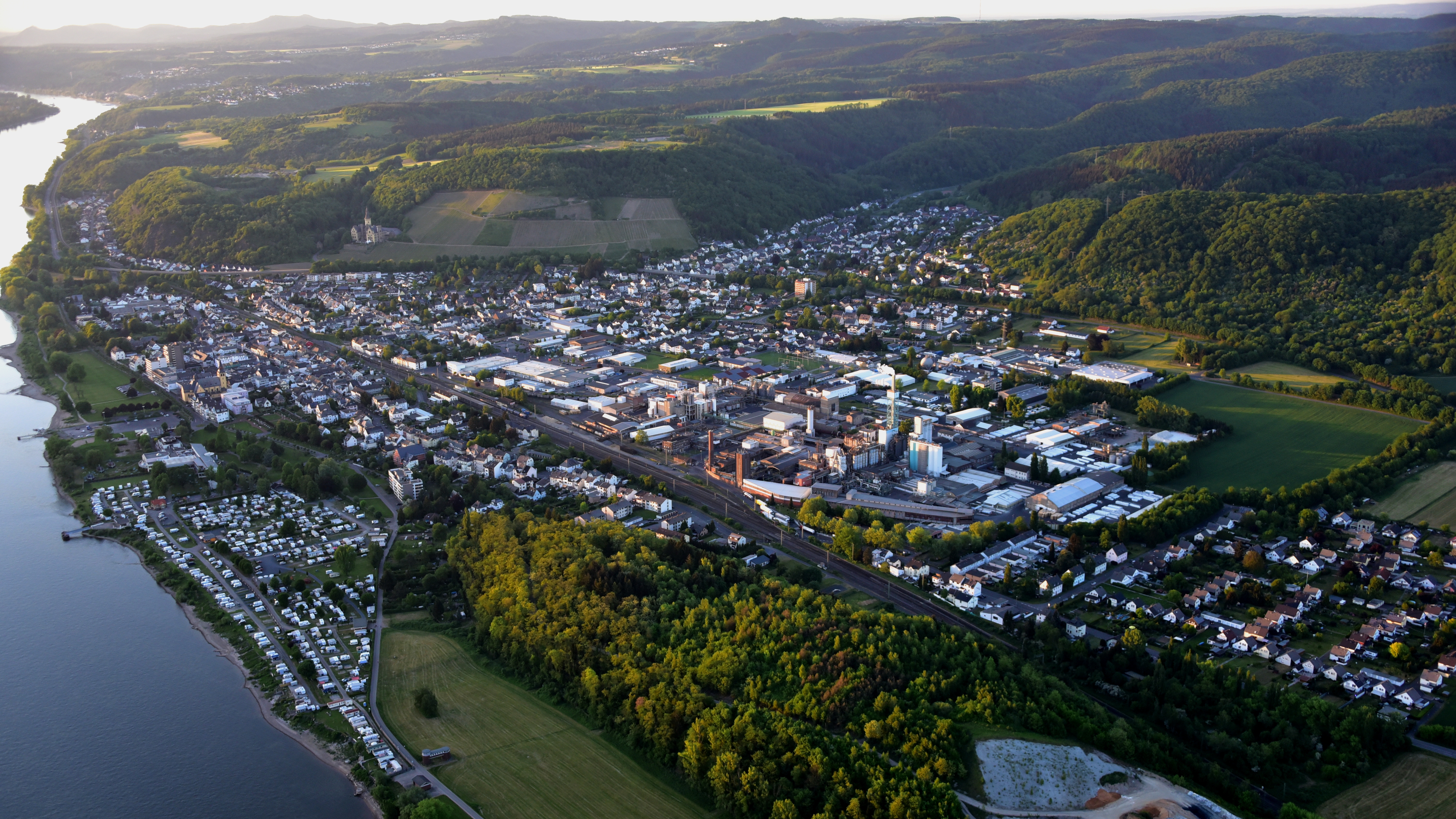
- Aerial view

- Coat of arms

- Location of Bad Hönningen within Neuwied district
- Interactive map of Bad Hönningen
- Location within Germany Location within Rhineland-Palatinate
- Coordinates: 50°31′04″N 7°18′31″E
- Country: Germany
- State: Rhineland-Palatinate
- District: Neuwied
- Municipal assoc.: Bad Hönningen

Government
  - Mayor (2019–24): Ulrich Elberskirch (Ind.)

Area
  - Total: 20.09 km^{2} (7.76 sq mi)
- Elevation: 65 m (213 ft)

Population (2025-12-31)
  - Total: 6,376
  - Density: 317.4/km^{2} (822.0/sq mi)
- Time zone: UTC+01:00 (CET)
  - Summer (DST): UTC+02:00 (CEST)
- Postal codes: 53557
- Dialling codes: 02635
- Vehicle registration: NR
- Website: www.bad-hoenningen.de

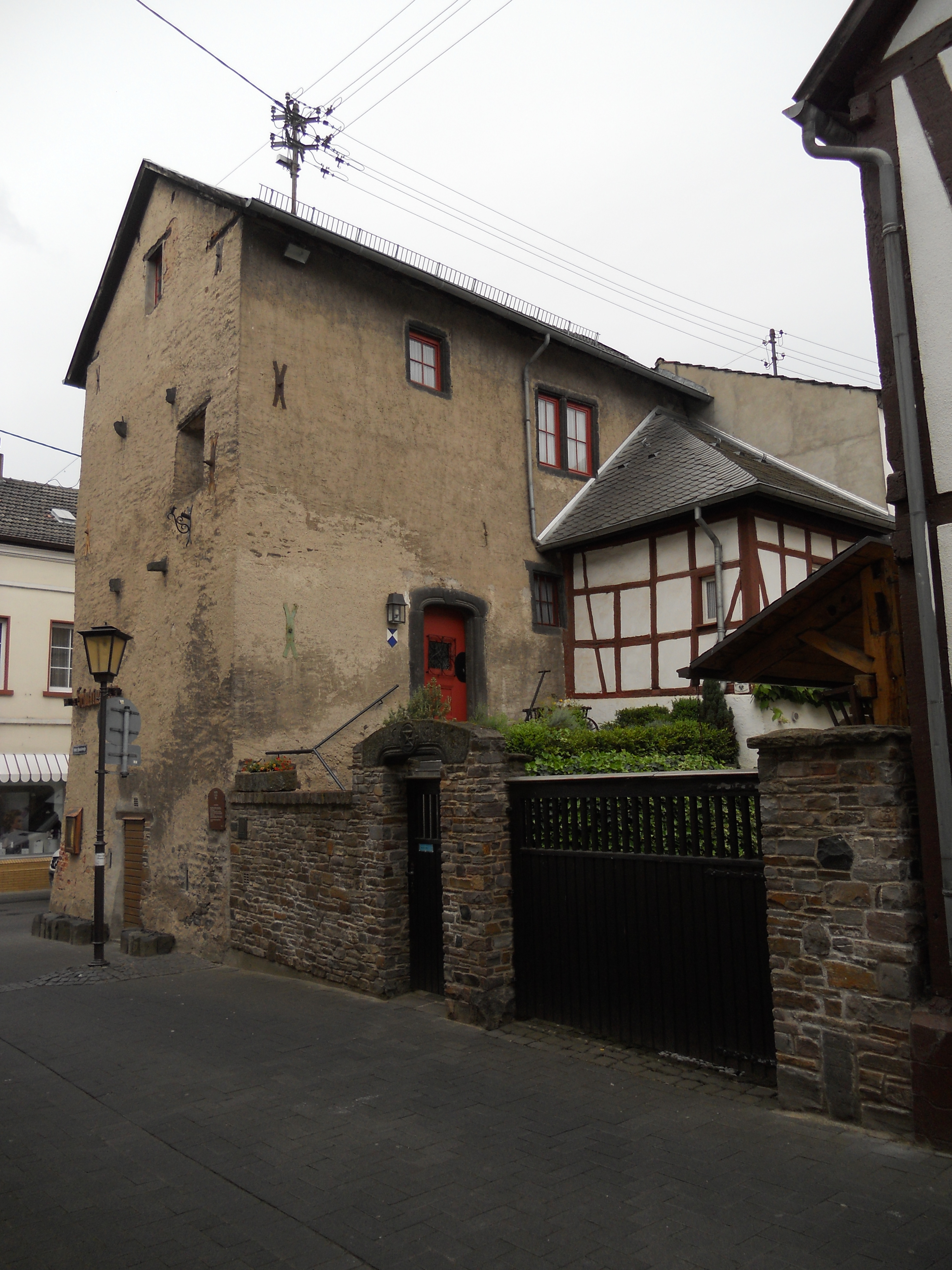
The Hohe Haus (high house), a 15th-century living and defensive tower

Bad Hönningen (German pronunciation: [baːt ˈhœnɪŋən]) is a municipality in the district of Neuwied, in Rhineland-Palatinate, Germany. It is situated on the right bank of the Rhine, approx. 15 km (10 mi) northwest of Neuwied, and 30 km (20 mi) southeast of Bonn.

Bad Hönningen is the seat of the Verbandsgemeinde ("collective municipality") Bad Hönningen. The town contains three other districts called Ariendorf, Girgenrath and Reidenbruch.

== History ==
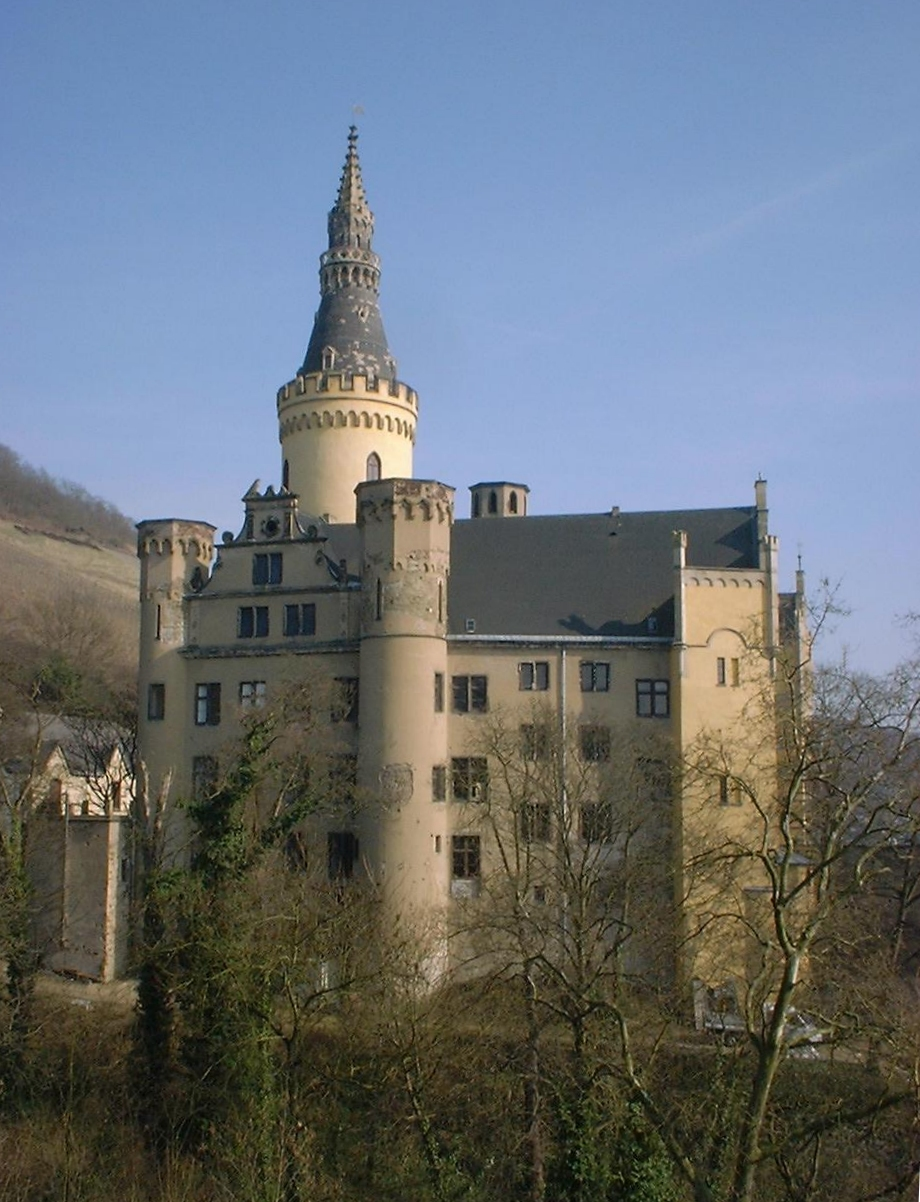
Bad Hönningen Arenfels castle

Archeological findings suggest that the first settlers lived here over 1800 years ago when the Romans occupied the Rhineland.

The limes ran between Bad Hönningen and Rheinbrohl, opposite the Vinxtbach, the border between Germania Inferior and Superior. At this point the limes crossed the Rhine and continued on the eastern bank. On this site a small castellum was built. In 1972 a Roman watchtower was reconstructed from archeological finds.

In 1019, the town was documentary mentioned as "Besitztum Hohingen" for the first time.

During Thirty Years' War in 1632 Bad Hönningen burned down except twelve houses.

The first bathhouse for medical treatment opened in 1895. Because of this, the town is legitimated to have the title "Bad" since 1950.

On 12 July 1969 it was granted the privileges of a town.

== Population development ==
The data 1871-1987 comes from census results.

- 1782: 1.398
- 1871: 1.794
- 1939: 4.312
- 1970: 5.732
- 1987: 5.454
- 2005: 5.733

== Sister town ==
- Saint Pierre lès Nemours (France) since 1980.

== Sights ==
- Castles:

"Schloss Arenfels" in Bad Hönningen "Burg Ariendorf" in Ariendorf (built 1840, neo-gothic)

- The "Hohe Haus" which was built in 1438 by the archbishop Raban von Helmstatt. Today a museum of the town is in there.
- The limes began near the city limit of Bad Hönningen. Today there is a museum called "Limes Center".

On 15 July 2005 UNESCO made this area a World Heritage Site.

- The Schlossberg of Bad Hönningen is the biggest vineyard in Middle Rhine (9 hectare).

== Notable people ==
- Karl-Heinz Thielen (born 1940 in Ariendorf district), football player
