= Rockenfeld =

Abandoned village in Germany

Coordinates: 50.50°N 7.393°E

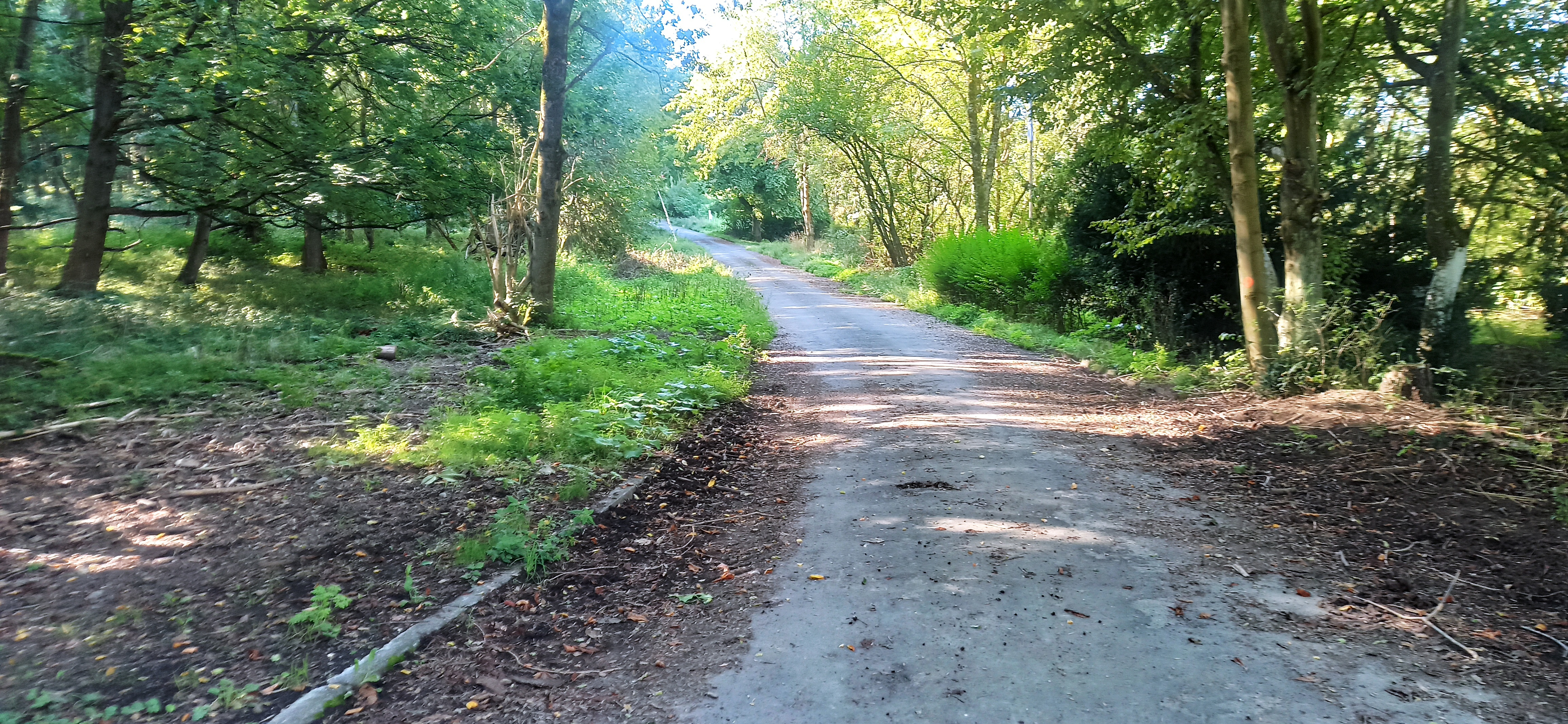
Rockenfeld in 2023; curbstones still visible

Rockenfeld

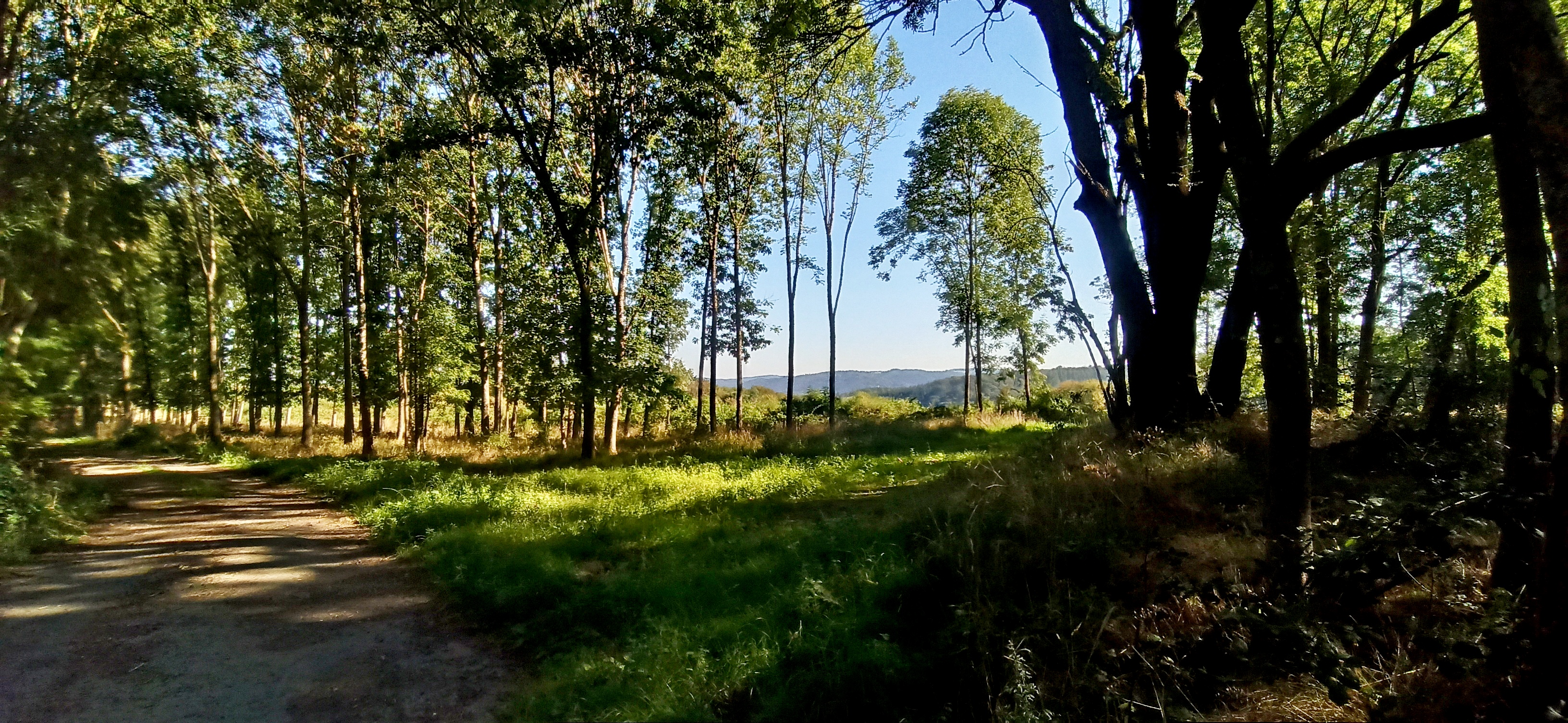
Rockenfeld 2023; background view towards Wied valley and Westerwald mountains

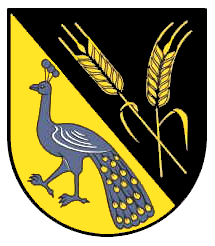
The coat of arms of the former commune

Rockenfeld is an abandoned village in the Feldkirchen district of Neuwied, Germany.

The surnames Rockenfeller and Rockefeller are derived from Rockenfeld. It is said that the ancestors of the Rockefeller family came from there.

== Geography ==
The abandoned village Rockenfeld lies at 330 m above sea level on a mountain range rising from north to south between the valleys of the creek Rockenfelder Bach in the west and a tributary of the Nonnenbach in the east. The forest district Forst Wied borders to the east. The only road connection is K1 (Kreisstraße 1), which leads down to Rheinbrohl over a length of eight kilometres into the Rhine Valley.

== History ==
The proximity of the place to the course of the Limes Germanicus, which delimited the Roman Empire, and the remains of a Roman fortlet "Am Forsthofweg" less than 1 km from Rockenfeld, would indicate an early settlement of the area.

It is reported that in later times, not only the burgraves of Hammerstein and the electoral principality of Trier, but also the house of counts of Wied later counts of Wied-Neuwied and the St Thomas's Abbey at Andernach had a court in Rockenfeld.

The village was first documented in 1280 as Rukenvelt, where Ruken would mean ridge and velt designate field. The name thus relates to the village's location on the first mountain ridge between the Rhine valley and the Westerwald.

Until 1693, it belonged to Gönnersdorf (today part of Feldkirchen/Neuwied). In 1846, 11 families lived in the village; starting from 1885, an official school was established, which was closed in 1935.

At the end of World War II, 50 people still lived in Rockenfeld. Due to constant emigration, the local council decided to dissolve the community in 1965. In 1969, the abandoned houses and courtyards were burned down by the fire brigade. In 1995 the last house was demolished.

== Rockenfeld today ==
Today (2023), Rockenfeld is a deserted area with a memorial from 1962/63 and a commemorative stone as the only remains, situated within the Rhine-Westerwald Nature Park.

For about 30 years, the tradition of the Rockenfeld fair (Rockenfelder Kirmes) has been established, a party organized on this site every year on May 1, by the Junggesellenverein association of Rheinbrohl. In addition to various drinks, it offers the traditional pea soup as well as sausages and other dishes. The event is particularly appreciated by hikers and cyclists.
