= Frank Hammerschmidt =

German clarinet manufacturer

Frank Hammerschmidt is a clarinet manufacturer located in Burgau in the Bavarian district of Günzburg, Germany. Frank Hammerschmidt passed his master craftsman examination in 1991 and is from the Hammerschmidt family which has been producing clarinets for generations. These clarinets are well regarded by professionals.
