= Bad Hönningen (Verbandsgemeinde) =

- Verbandsgemeinde
- Coat of arms

- Location of Bad Hönningen within Neuwied district
- Interactive map of Bad Hönningen
- Location within Germany Location within Rhineland-Palatinate
- Coordinates: 50°31′N 7°18′E
- Country: Germany
- State: Rhineland-Palatinate
- District: Neuwied
- Seat: Bad Hönningen
- Subdivisions: 4 municipalities

Area
  - Total: 55.36 km^{2} (21.37 sq mi)

Population (2025-12-31)
  - Total: 12,787
  - Density: 231.0/km^{2} (598.2/sq mi)
- Time zone: UTC+01:00 (CET)
  - Summer (DST): UTC+02:00 (CEST)
- Website: www.bad-hoenningen-vg.de

Bad Hönningen is a Verbandsgemeinde ("collective municipality") in the district of Neuwied, in Rhineland-Palatinate, Germany. The seat of the Verbandsgemeinde is in Bad Hönningen.

The Verbandsgemeinde Bad Hönningen consists of the following Ortsgemeinden ("local municipalities"):

1. Bad Hönningen
2. Hammerstein
3. Leutesdorf
4. Rheinbrohl
