= Rheinbrohl =

- Municipality
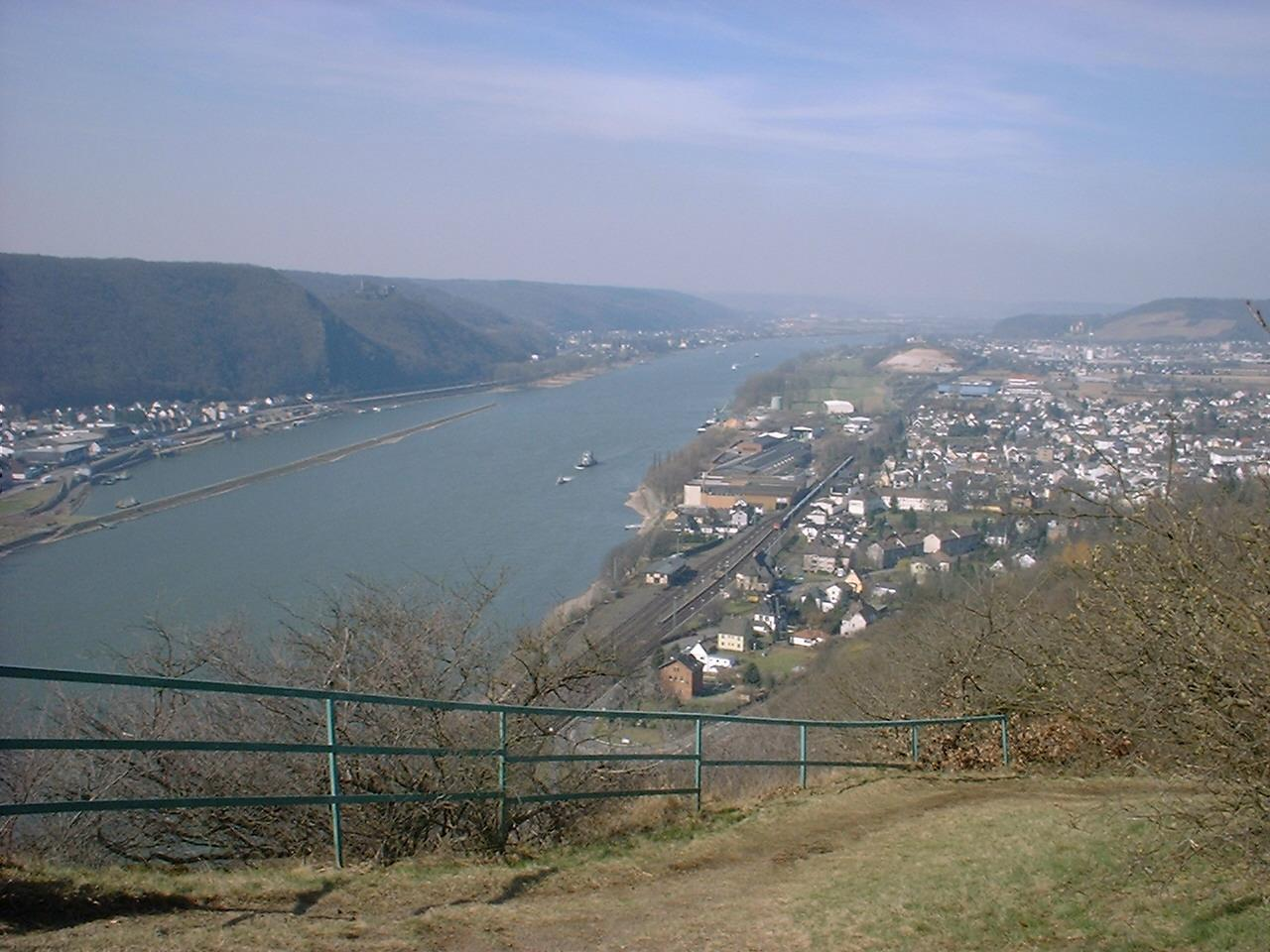

- Coat of arms

- Location of Rheinbrohl within Neuwied district
- Interactive map of Rheinbrohl
- Location within Germany Location within Rhineland-Palatinate
- Coordinates: 50°29′42″N 7°20′05″E
- Country: Germany
- State: Rhineland-Palatinate
- District: Neuwied
- Municipal assoc.: Bad Hönningen

Government
  - Mayor (2024–29): Oliver Labonde (CDU)

Area
  - Total: 17.2 km^{2} (6.6 sq mi)
- Elevation: 83 m (272 ft)

Population (2025-12-31)
  - Total: 4,197
  - Density: 244/km^{2} (632/sq mi)
- Time zone: UTC+01:00 (CET)
  - Summer (DST): UTC+02:00 (CEST)
- Postal codes: 56598
- Dialling codes: 02635
- Vehicle registration: NR
- Website: www.rheinbrohl.de

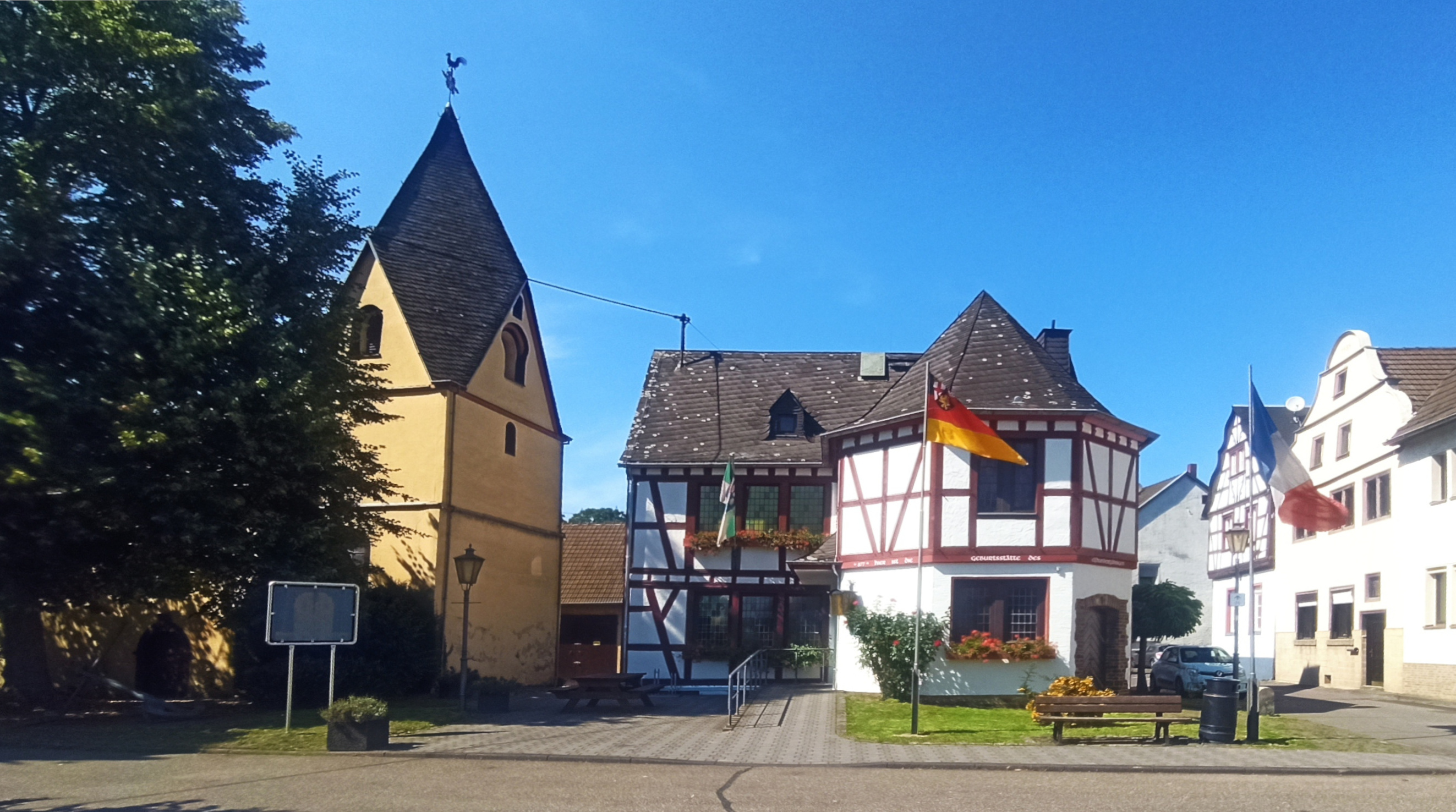
Rheinbrohl historical town hall at the ancient court of Gertrudenhof with its chapel

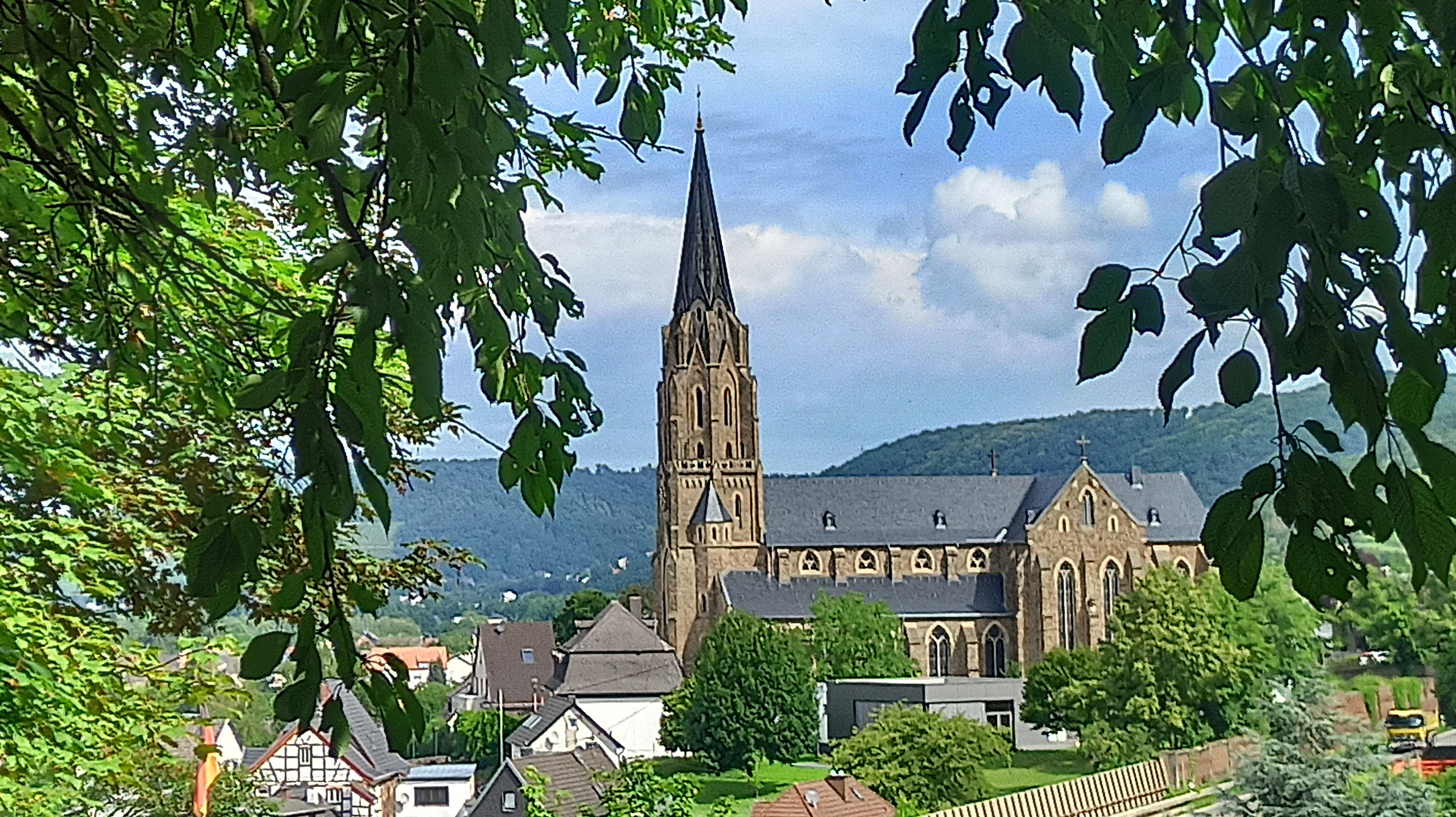
St. Suitbert's Catholic Parish Church

Rheinbrohl (German pronunciation: [ˈʁaɪnbʁoːl]; Latin origin of the name: Broele trans Rhenum) is a municipality in the territorial collectivity (Verbandsgemeinde) of Bad Hönningen, in the district of Neuwied, in Rhineland-Palatinate, in western Germany. On its Rhine bank is the starting point of the Upper Germanic-Rhaetian Limes, the fortification of 550 km length which delimited the Roman Empire. At this place near the Rhine is the reconstruction of a Roman watchtower.

== Geography ==
Rheinbrohl is a wine village of the Rhine valley, located on the east bank, opposite Brohl-Lützing, and south of the spa town of Bad Hönningen. The municipality is part of the Rhine-Westerwald Nature Park. From the geological point of view, the rock of the Rheinbrohler Ley, which overhangs the Rhine to the south of the village, can be considered as forming the southern end of the valley opening, called Linz-Hönninger Talweitung, while the part to the east of the municipal territory is located on the wooded ridge of the Rhein-Wied-Rücken which separates the Rhine valley from that of its tributary, the Wied. The highest point of this ridge is the Malberg at an altitude of nearly 373 m. In Rheinbrohl began the Limes of Upper Germania, built by the Romans, whose route has been officially listed as a UNESCO World Heritage Site since 15 July 2005.

== History ==
In the late second and early third centuries AD, the area of today's Rheinbrohl was the site of a small Roman fort (castellum). It was the north-western beginning of the Upper Germanic-Raetian Limes, which delimited the Roman Empire.

Rheinbrohl itself was first mentioned on 3 May 877 in a letter from King Charles the Bald because the place belonged at that time to the Abbey of Nivelles in the Duchy of Brabant. In 1606, Rheinbrohl fell into the Electorate of Trier, and later went, during the secularization in 1803, to the House of Nassau, then, after the Congress of Vienna in 1815, to the Kingdom of Prussia, and then to the Rhine Province.

== Historic sites ==
- The Gertrude Chapel whose historical structure dates back to the 13th century and an altar from the 17th century. The chapel carries the oldest bell in Rheinbrohl, from 1696.
- Next to the Gertrude Chapel is the main building of the ancient court of Gertrudenhof whose existence is attested since the seventh century. That historical building is currently hosting the village's city hall.
- The Maria Hilf Chapel in the north-east of the village, with a statue of the Madonna from the late 14th century.
- St. Suitbert's Catholic parish church, overlooking the whole village, in neo-Gothic style, built from 1852 to 1856 according to plans by the Cologne diocesan architect, Vincenz Statz. In this church is erected every year the traditional "root nativity scene" which can be visited from December 24 to February 2.
- Protestant church in neo-Gothic style, built in 1888 by architect Friedrich Lang from Wiesbaden.
- The 29er-Ehrenmal peace memorial built in the 1930s on Rheinbrohler Ley mountain in memory of the dead of the 3rd Rhenish Infantry Regiment, number 29, during the First World War. It contains a relief made by the sculptor Carl Burger, showing four apocalyptic horsemen symbolizing the horrors of war "hunger", "plague", "war" and "death". This place is on the route of the Rheinsteig hiking trail.
- A little further above the memorial is the viewpoint of the Rheinbrohler Ley. A rocky mountain that towers over the Rhine and offers a splendid view in all directions.
- In the valley, at the northern edge of the communal land, a reconstruction of the first Roman watchtower stands next to the access road to the ferry across the Rhine to Bad Breisig. This tower was built in 1974 with stones found in the Limes ruins in the Rheinbrohl forest.
- Since 2008, the RömerWelt (a Roman-themed center) has opened, accessible from the federal road B42 by the exit north of Rheinbrohl.

== Transport infrastructure ==
=== Public transport ===
Rheinbrohl has a railway station of the Right Bank Rhine Railway (rechte Rheinstrecke) from Cologne to Wiesbaden. The locality is served by regional trains Regionalbahn 27 and Regionalexpress 8 (from Mönchengladbach via Cologne to Koblenz).

Rheinbrohl is also served by buses of the Rhein-Mosel transport association, on the line from Neuwied to Linz.

=== Road ===
Rheinbrohl is connected to the metropolitan areas of Cologne/Bonn in the north and Koblenz in the south by the federal road B 42 (which does not lead through the town centre). The Rhine river can be crossed in Rheinbrohl via a passenger and car ferry, which runs every 15 minutes between early morning and late evening. The only access road up to the former village of Rockenfeld, which is now deserted, leads from Rheinbrohl via the K1 district road.

=== Bicycle ===
Rheinbrohl is crossed from south to north by the bike route EuroVelo 15 which runs all along the Rhine banks, from its source in Switzerland to its mouth area in the Netherlands.

The German Limes cycle path also leads through Rheinbrohl, which passes as close as possible to the course of the Roman Limes border fortifications, linking the Rhine with the Danube and further with the Austrian border close to the town of Passau.

=== Hiking trails ===
The municipal territory is crossed by several signposted hiking routes, named Rheinsteig, Westerwald-Steig and Limeswanderweg (Limes hiking trail). All three hiking routes are passing close to the Roman themed center RömerWelt at the B42 road exit to Rheinbrohl and Arienheller.

== Sister city ==
Bourcefranc-le-Chapus in France is Rheinbrohl's sister city since 1965. This commune (at the time Bourcefranc) was the first in Poitou-Charentes to be twinned. This partnership continues intensely today.

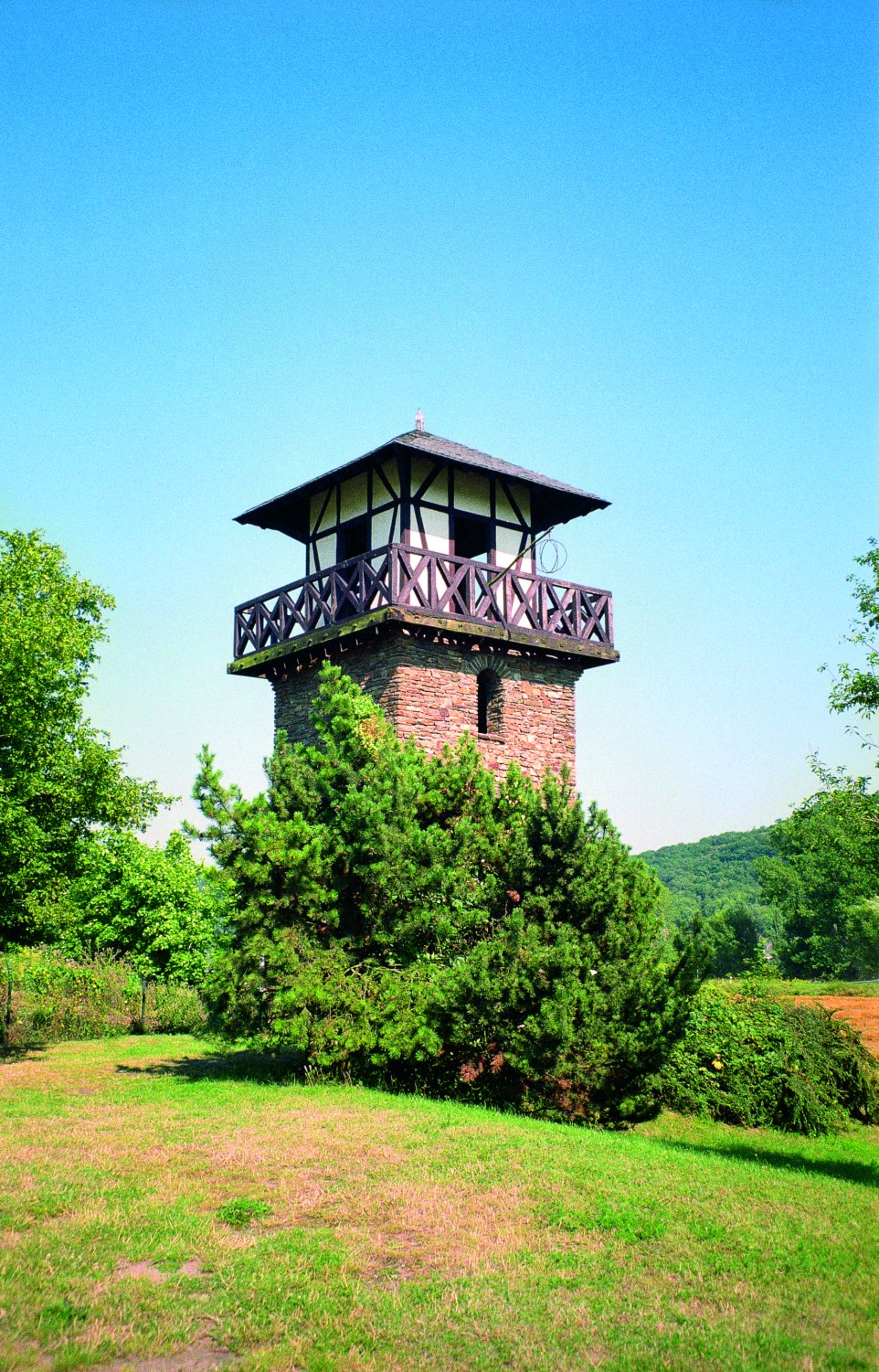
Reconstructed Roman watchtower
