= Hammerstein =

Hammerstein am Rhein
- Municipality
- Coat of arms

- Location of Hammerstein am Rhein within Neuwied district
- Interactive map of Hammerstein am Rhein
- Location within Germany Location within Rhineland-Palatinate
- Coordinates: 50°28′37″N 7°21′04″E
- Country: Germany
- State: Rhineland-Palatinate
- District: Neuwied
- Municipal assoc.: Bad Hönningen
- Subdivisions: 2

Government
  - Mayor (2019–24): Jörg Jungbluth (FW)

Area
  - Total: 7.20 km^{2} (2.78 sq mi)
- Elevation: 70 m (230 ft)

Population (2025-12-31)
  - Total: 354
  - Density: 49.2/km^{2} (127/sq mi)
- Time zone: UTC+01:00 (CET)
  - Summer (DST): UTC+02:00 (CEST)
- Postal codes: 56598
- Dialling codes: 02635
- Vehicle registration: NR
- Website: hammerstein-am-rhein.de

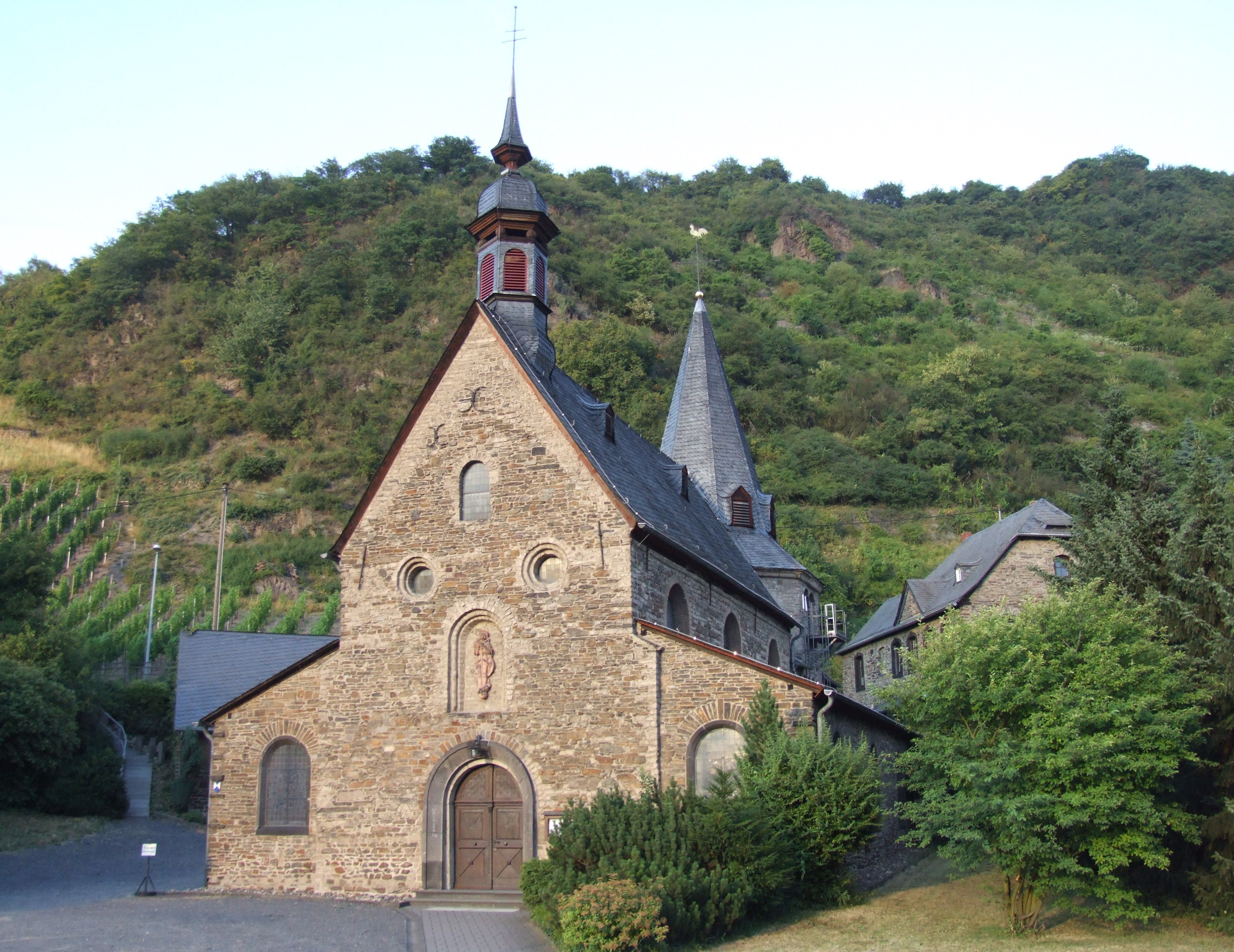
Saint George's church

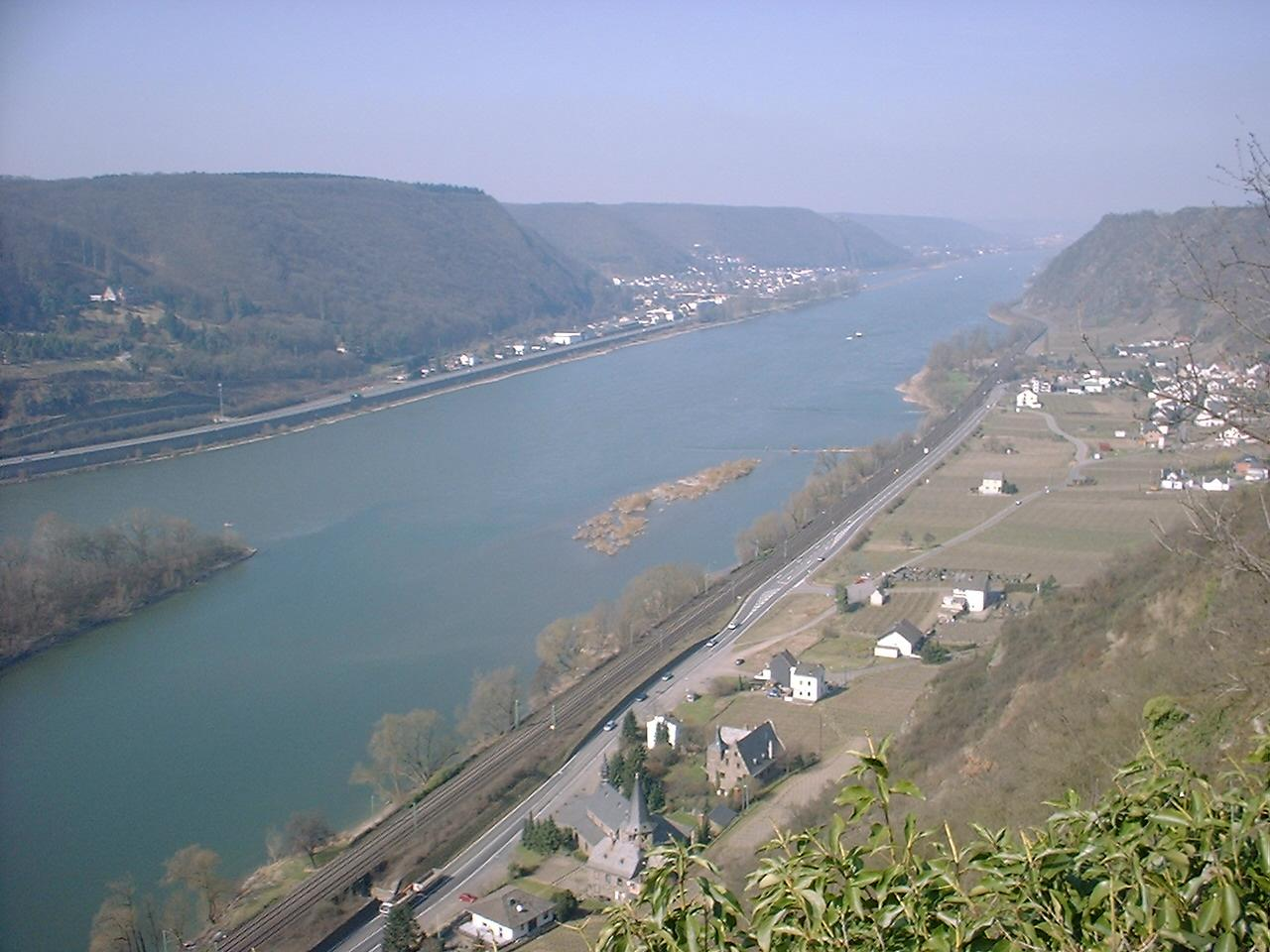
Niederhammerstein

Hammerstein is a municipality on the river Rhine in the district of Neuwied in Rhineland-Palatinate in Germany. Near the village, is the Hammerstein castle. The ancient German noble family Hammerstein, which have sponsored the Hammerstein Ballroom in New York, comes from here.

== History ==
The north-eastern part of the Hammerstein district was crossed by the Upper Germanic Limes during the Roman Empire. Part of this border wall was the small fort "Am Forsthofweg", which is located on today's municipal territory.

Centuries later, the villages of Niederhammerstein and Oberhammerstein developed under the protection of the hilltop castle of Hammerstein, which was first mentioned in a document in 1002. The origins of the castle date back to the 10th century. The earliest documentary mention of Niederhammerstein dates back to 1225. The village of Oberhammerstein, located at the foot of the castle, was granted town rights in 1337. In 1357, Emperor Karl IV confirmed to the lords of the castle an even older right to strike coins and hold fairs. The castle remained in use until the middle of the 17th century and was only razed in 1654 by troops from the Electorate of Trier. From 1419 to 1788, Hammerstein was the seat of the Electorate of Trier, and between 1803 and 1815 of the Ducal-Nassau Office of Hammerstein, a lower administrative and judicial district. Niederhammerstein and Oberhammerstein were independent municipalities until 1936.

== Sights ==
Hammerstein is home to numerous historical monuments whose origins date back to the High Middle Ages and Roman times and which bear witness to the town's long history.

- The location of the former small fort and current ground monument as well as other traces and reconstructions of the rampart, ditch and palisade of the Upper Germanic Limes are accessible in the Hammerstein area via the Limes hiking trail leading from Rheinbrohl to Niederbieber.

Another important and interesting long-distance hiking trail, the Rheinsteig, passes through the Hammerstein district.

- Hammerstein Castle, built in the 10th century, is probably the oldest castle in the Middle Rhine Valley. It was first mentioned as an imperial castle in 1002. Between the last quarter of the 11th century and the beginning of the 14th century, it had a certain importance as a customs castle. In the 12th century, the imperial insignia were repeatedly kept there. Its ruins are located on a rock rising from the Rhine in the south of the municipality. It can be visited and is one of the town's main attractions.
- The Romanesque origins of the parish church of St George in Oberhammerstein date back to the 11th or 12th century. The two bells, with diameters of 96 and 61 cm respectively, were cast around 1050. They are the oldest church bells on the Middle Rhine and the only Romanesque double bells in Germany.
- The so-called Burgmannshof, also known as Claurenburg, a 16th century tithe farm, is located on the same site where a royal court was documented as early as 1176. It was first mentioned in a document as Burgmannshof in 1556. In the 1920s and early 1930s, the building housed a youth hostel. The Burgmannshof has been privately owned since 1937.
- The old Jewish cemetery, which was used from the 17th to the early 20th century, is located on the forest path from the Hammerstein castle ruins to Leutesdorf. The burials were carried out by a small Jewish community based in Leutesdorf. A total of 21 gravestones have been preserved.
- The Catholic branch church of St Katharina in Niederhammerstein also dates back to the 17th century. However, it goes back to an older sacred building mentioned in a document in 1424. Its sacristy dates back to 1742 and the building was extended in 1872.
- The Krewl vineyard in Niederhammerstein dates back to a 17th or 18th century nunnery in the Electorate of Cologne.
- The Hammersteiner Werth is the Rhine island off Hammerstein. It serves as a fishing area and is popular with locals as a bathing beach in summer.
