= Sisterhood of St. John the Baptist =

Roman Catholic religious institute

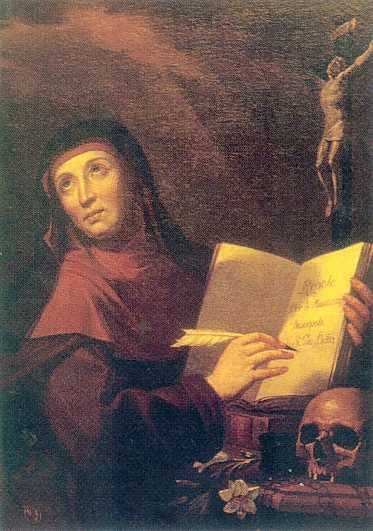
Venerable Giovanna Solimani

The Sisterhood of St. John the Baptist or Baptistines is a Roman Catholic religious institute dedicated to Saint John the Baptist. It was founded near Genoa in 1730 by Giovanna Solimani.

== History ==
Giovanna Maria Baptista Solimani was born in 1688 in Alburo, near Genoa. At the age of sixteen she taught embroidery and singing to girls at the church of Santa Maria alla Castagna.

At the age of thirty-one, she began communal life at Moneglia with a few other young women. Capuchin, Father Athanasius assisted them with advice in drawing up of their rule.

The group took the name "Hermit Sisters of St. John the Baptist" ("Baptistines"). Their intent was to lead a life of penitence as a cloistered community. All the choir sisters added to their names in religion that of Baptista in honour of their model, John the Baptist. They soon came under the direction of Dominic Francis Olivieri, archpriest of the parish of Santa Croce in Moneglia. Solimani went to Rome in 1744 and with the aid of the Barnabite Mario Maccabei obtained the approval of Pope Benedict XIV. Two years later, on 20 April 1746, the Archbishop of Genoa received the religious profession of Giovanna Solimani and her twelve companions. Solimani was elected abbess. and governed the house until her death on 8 April 1758.

In 1755 the congregation sent a group to Rome. Houses were also founded in other cities of Italy. The congregation drew its members from among the young girls and widows who were admitted into their houses as lay-sisters. Tertiaries took care of their churches and gathered the alms they needed. A rigorous cloister was observed. The sisters rose at midnight for Matins, slept in their clothes, went bare-footed, and observed continual abstinence from meat. Their whole life was one of extreme austerity. Solimani governed the congregation until her death on 8 April 1758.

== Present day ==
The congregation was based in Genoa, on a street called to this day "Salita delle Battistine". In 1924, they moved to the Sturla section of the city. The monastery is located next to the Church of St. John the Baptist, where the foundress is buried. In 1972, nuns from the monastery of Sturla established a foundation at Brovarone, in the Piedmont.

In 2019 the Congregation for the Causes of Saints issued a decree declaring Solimani "Venerable".
