= Carl Kühne KG =

German food manufacturer

- Type: Public
- Industry: food
- Founded: 1722
- Headquarters: Hamburg, Germany
- Key people: Kai Bendix (Chairman) Christian Strey (Finance, Controlling, IT)Heiner Opdenfeld (Supply Chain)
- Products: food
- Revenue: 400 Mio. Euro
- Number of employees: 1,429
- Website: www.kuehne.de

Carl Kühne KG is a German food manufacturer which mainly produces vinegars and delicacies. As one of the largest vinegar, pickled gherkin and mustard producers in Europe, the family-owned business sells its products in over 50 countries. Kühne produces a range of condiments, salad dressings, pickled foods and sauces. In addition to its products for the end consumer, Kühne also supplies the gastronomy and food industries. Two-thirds of their sales are generated in Germany and one third abroad. Its products are distributed to the fast food and food sectors in Europe, the Middle East, Asia, Africa, Australia and the Americas.

== Company data ==
Carl Kühne KG was founded in 1722. Its headquarters are located in Hamburg and employs 150 employees. The business's management is made up of Kai Bendix (Chairman), Christian Strey (Finance, Controlling, IT) and Heiner Opdenfeld (Supply Chain).

Carl Kühne KG has production plants in various locations around Germany, including Berlin, Cuxhaven, Hagenow, Schweinfurt, Hamm and Straelen. Outside Germany is produced in France (Dijon) and Turkey (İzmir).

== Brands ==
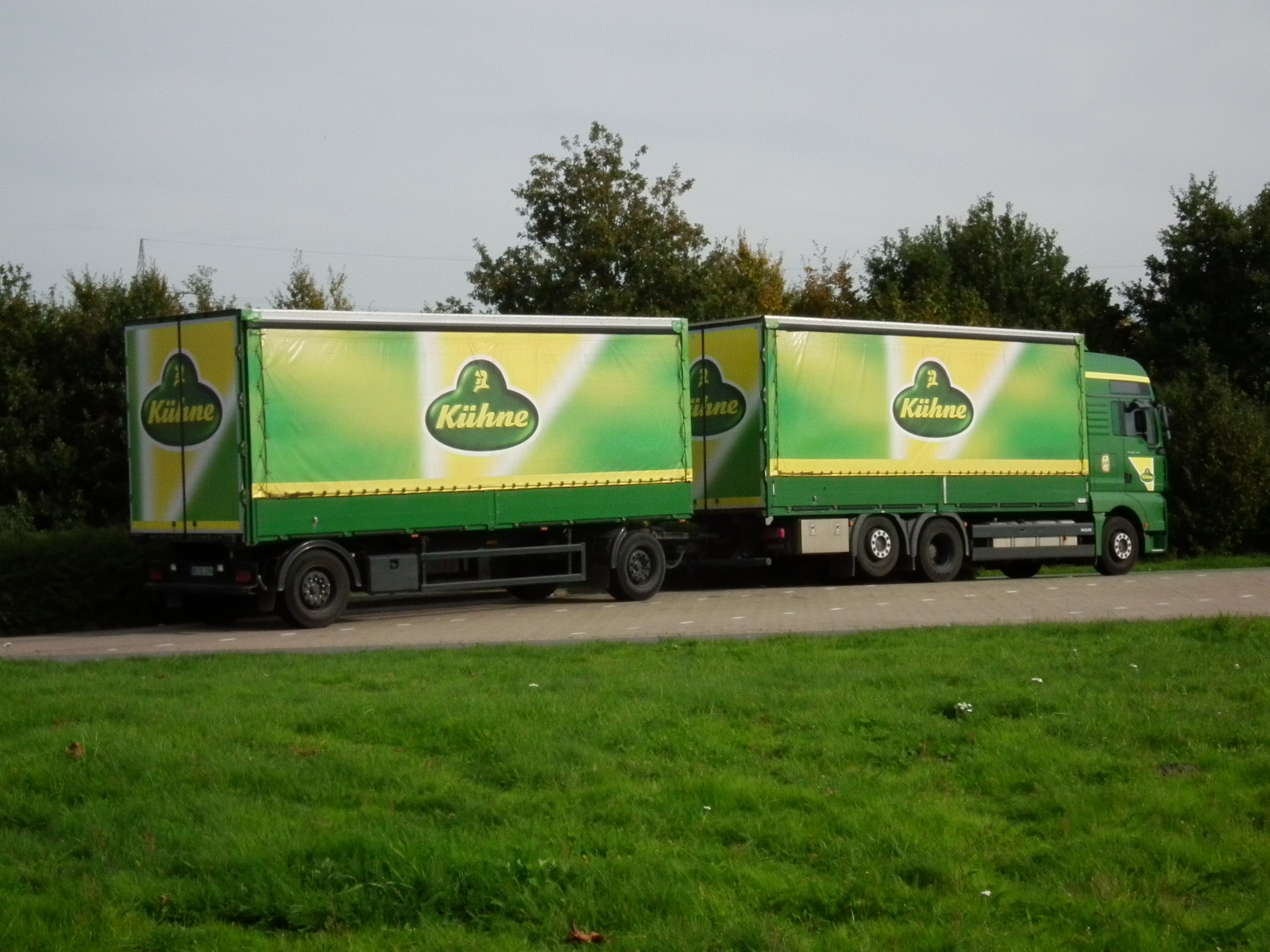
Carl Kühne Company Truck

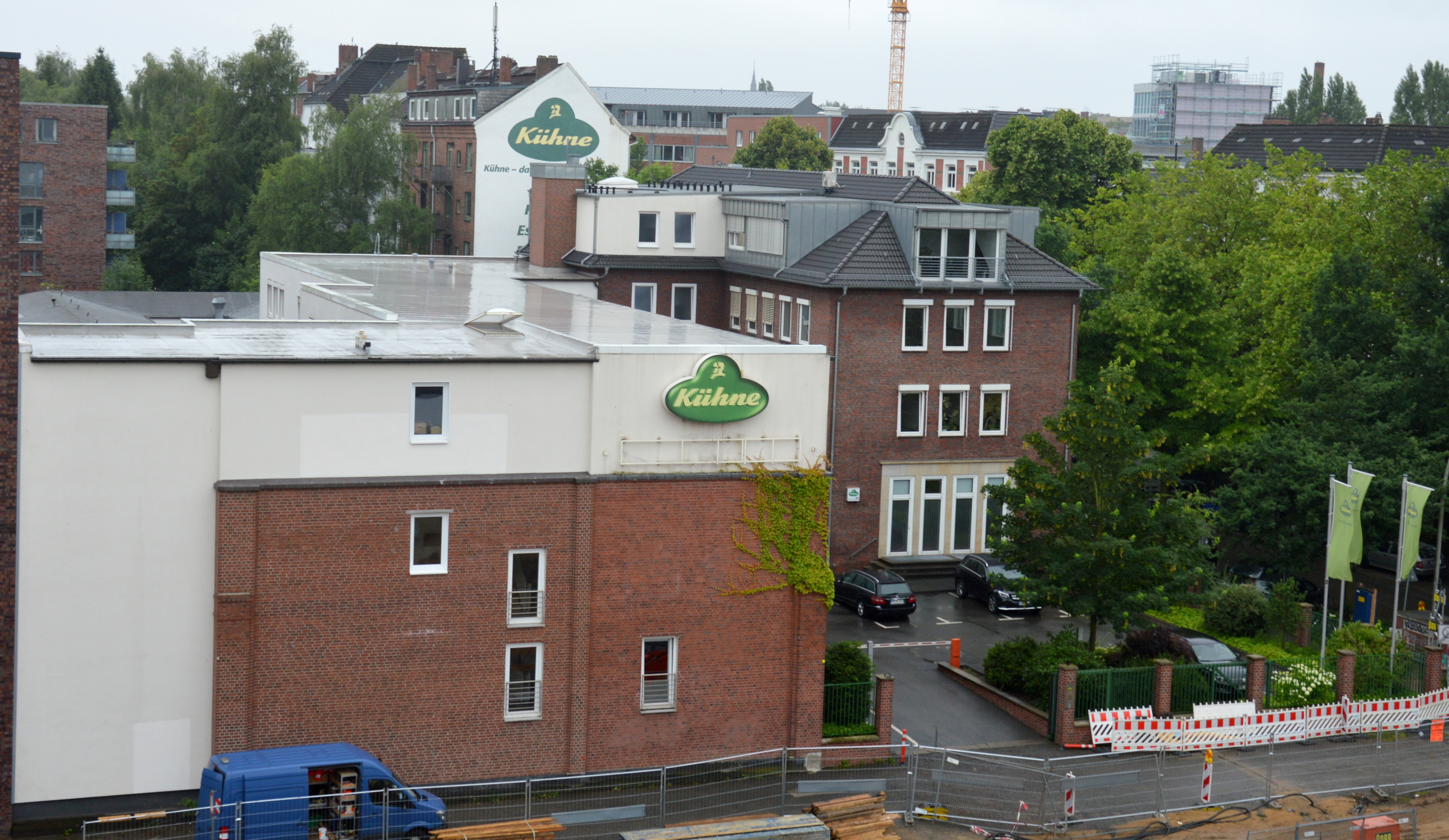
Kühne Headquarter, Hamburg 2017

In addition to the Kühne brand, the group also includes the following brands:

- Bornier (France)
- Gundelsheim (Export)
- Kauffmann
- Luycks (Benelux)
- TONOLI delicatessen (under the company name „Gritto-Werke, 19230 Hagenow“)
- Uyttewaal (Benelux)
- Téméraire (France)

== History ==
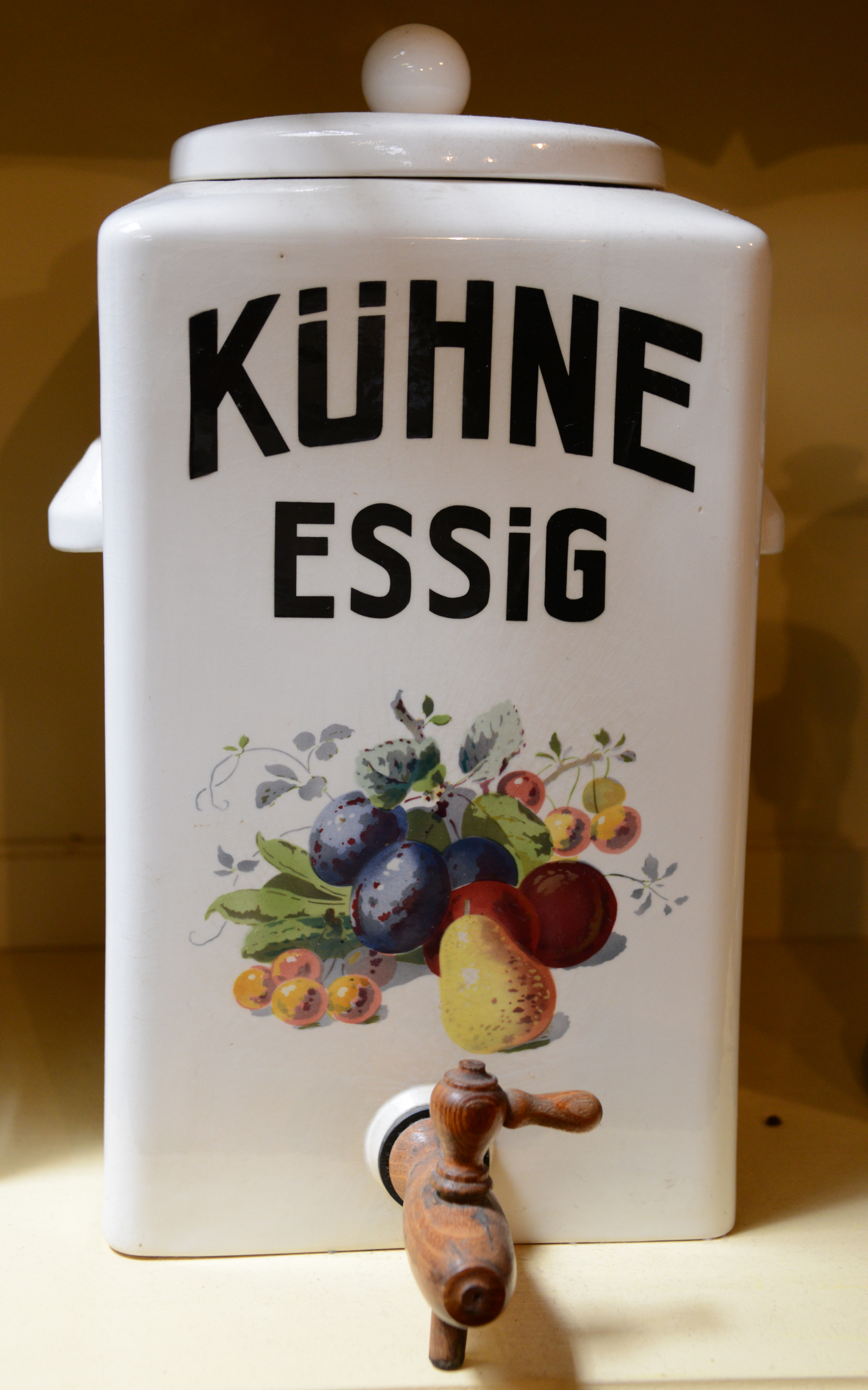
Vinegar container from the 20th century, Kreismuseum, Syke

- 1722: Johann Daniel Epinius founds a vinegar brewery in Berlin.
- 1761: Epinius's widow sells the company to the Kühne family, namely Friedrich Wilhelm Kühne.
- 1795: Construction ends on a larger vinegar factory in Alte Jacobstraße, Berlin-Kreuzberg, which houses production for the next 40 years.
- 1832: Carl Ernst Wilhelm Kühne takes over the business and is the first person to introduce Schützenbach's quick-vinegar manufacturing process. The company took on its present name.
- 1835: Kühne builds a new, much larger factory in Neue Grünstraße, Berlin.
- 1867: Carl Kühne takes over the company.
- 1876: Kaiser Wilhelm 1st appoints Kühne as purveyor to the court.
- 1888: Wilhelm Kühne succeeds his father. New factories are built in Hamburg and on the coast near the fish processing industry.
- 1896: Kühne decides to include mustard in the production program. In Berlin, a new production facility is put into operation on Belle-Alliance-Straße (today Mehringdamm).
- 1902: Kühne introduces mayonnaise into the German market as a finished product, according to the English model.
- 1903: The production of gherkins begins.
- 1905: Kühne includes sauerkraut in his production program. Under the "Surol" brand, Kühne sells vinegar in bottles, creating one of the first branded products in Germany.
- 1939: The company now has 20 branches, mainly in the north, west and east of Germany.
- 1945: After the end of the Second World War, almost all their companies were badly damaged or destroyed. The branch in Hamburg became the new headquarters of the company. Production began again.
- 1949: Kühne sets up new businesses throughout Germany.
- 1949 The old Berlin companies are replaced by a new facility in Reinickendorf. Here, the company produces vinegar and mustard, and later ketchup and barbecue sauces.
- 1949: Kühne sets up a business in Straelen-Herongen.
- 1957: Kühne is the first manufacturer to introduce a ready-to-serve pickled red cabbage, one of the first convenience foods to enter the German market.
- 1995: The vinegar factory at the Hamburg plant burns down completely. One year later, Kühne starts building a new vinegar factory in Hagenow ( Mecklenburg-Vorpommern).
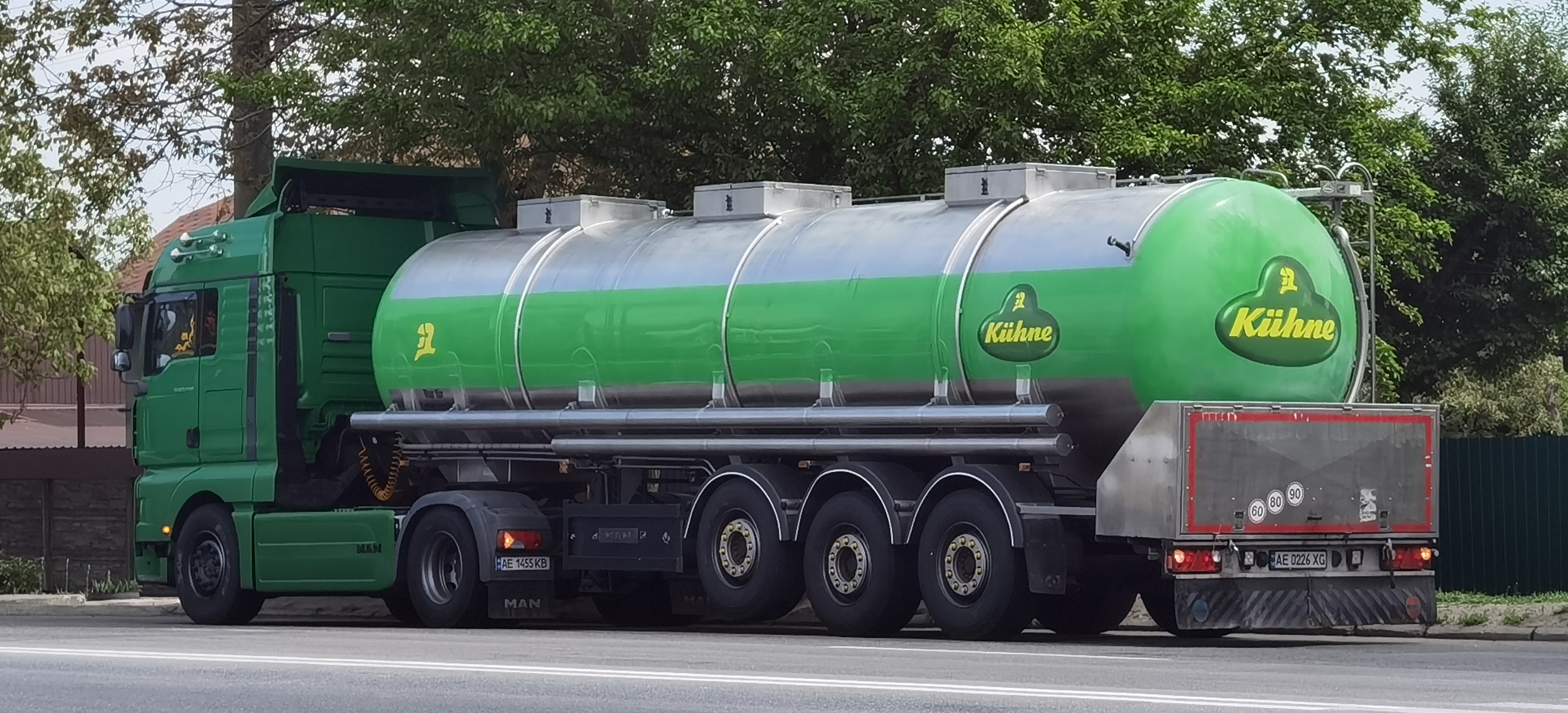
- Carl Kühne cistern truck
  2008: Kühne opens a warehouse in Straelen-Herongen.
- 2015: Launch of sub-brand ENJOY. Product launch of ENJOY salad dressings and vegetable chips.
- 2016: Launch of the sub-brand MADE FOR MEAT.
