= Hermits of St. John the Baptist =

Roman Catholic religious order

The Congregation of the Hermits of St. John the Baptist of France or Baptistines was a Roman Catholic religious order dedicated to Saint John the Baptist.

== History ==
The congregation was founded about 1630 by Michel de Saint-Sabine who reformed and united the hermits of various dioceses. He established for each diocese a visitor, who was aided by four majors and a secretary. The bishop received the religious when they took the habit and made their profession, and the brothers in a diocese met together once a year. Saint-Sabine gave the congregation a collection of statutes which regulated their mode of life.

The first bishops to make these statutes obligatory in their dioceses were the Bishop of Metz (1633), and the Bishop of Cambrai (1634). Jean-Baptiste carried this reform into the Dioceses of Vienne, Lyon, Geneva, Le Puy-en-Velay, and Langres. The Bishop of Langres, Louis Armand de Simiane de Gordes, added in 1680, for the hermits in his diocese, several ordinances to those of Saint-Sabine. He established four visitors, one for each division of the diocese, and distinguished the brothers with a white habit.

Jean-Baptiste went to the Diocese of Angers to found the hermitage of Gardelles and died there 24 December 1691.
