= Leutesdorf =

- Municipality
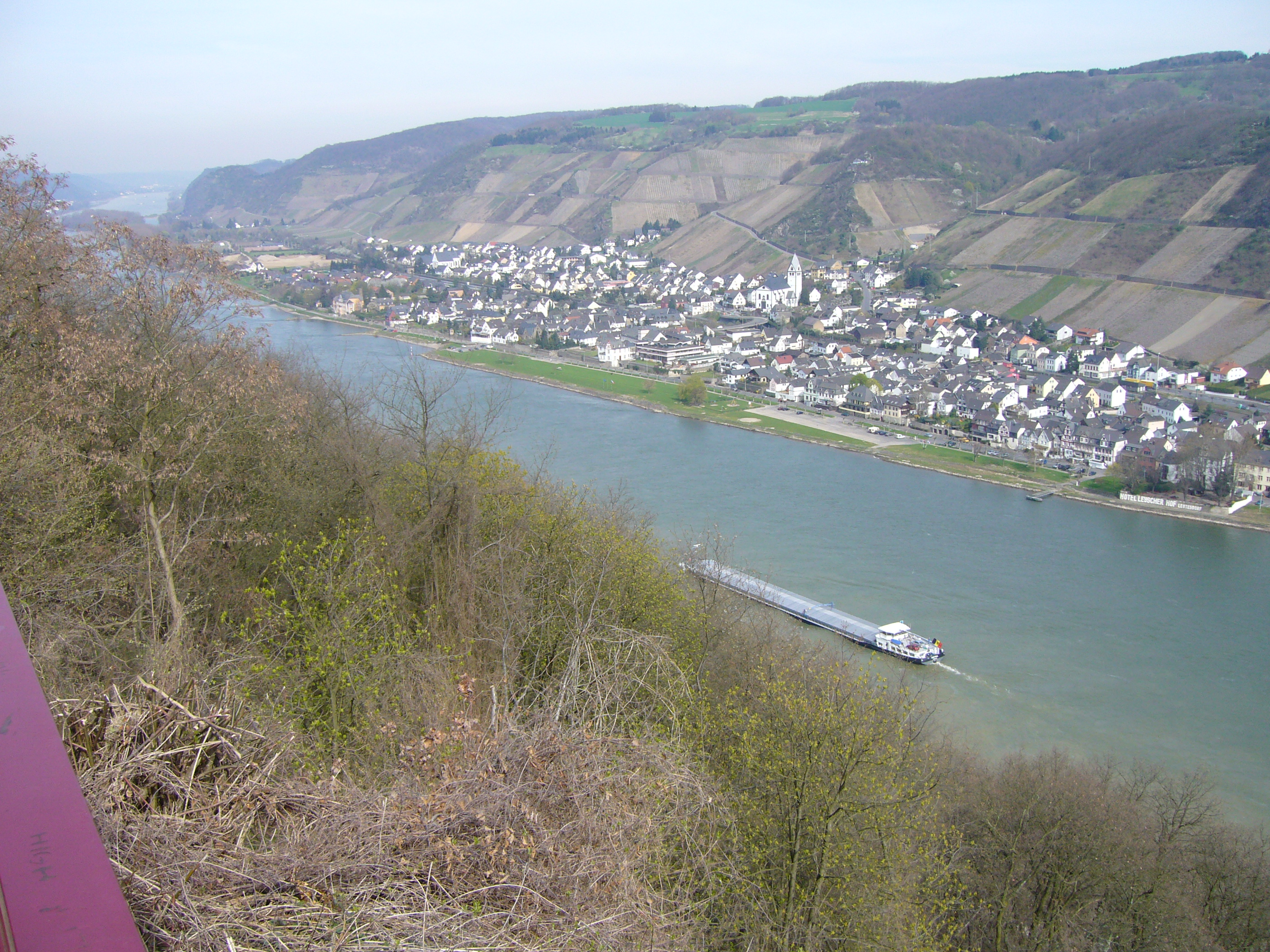

- Coat of arms

- Location of Leutesdorf within Neuwied district
- Interactive map of Leutesdorf
- Location within Germany Location within Rhineland-Palatinate
- Coordinates: 50°27′05″N 07°23′19″E
- Country: Germany
- State: Rhineland-Palatinate
- District: Neuwied
- Municipal assoc.: Bad Hönningen

Government
  - Mayor (2019–24): Heinz-Willi Heisterkamp (SPD)

Area
  - Total: 10.88 km^{2} (4.20 sq mi)
- Elevation: 75 m (246 ft)

Population (2025-12-31)
  - Total: 1,860
  - Density: 171/km^{2} (443/sq mi)
- Time zone: UTC+01:00 (CET)
  - Summer (DST): UTC+02:00 (CEST)
- Postal codes: 56599
- Dialling codes: 02631
- Vehicle registration: NR
- Website: www.leutesdorf-rhein.de

Leutesdorf (German pronunciation: [ˈlɔʏtəsdɔʁf]) is a municipality in the district of Neuwied, in Rhineland-Palatinate, Germany.
