= Hammerstein castle =

German mountain castle ruin

Coordinates: 50°28′15″N 7°21′28″E

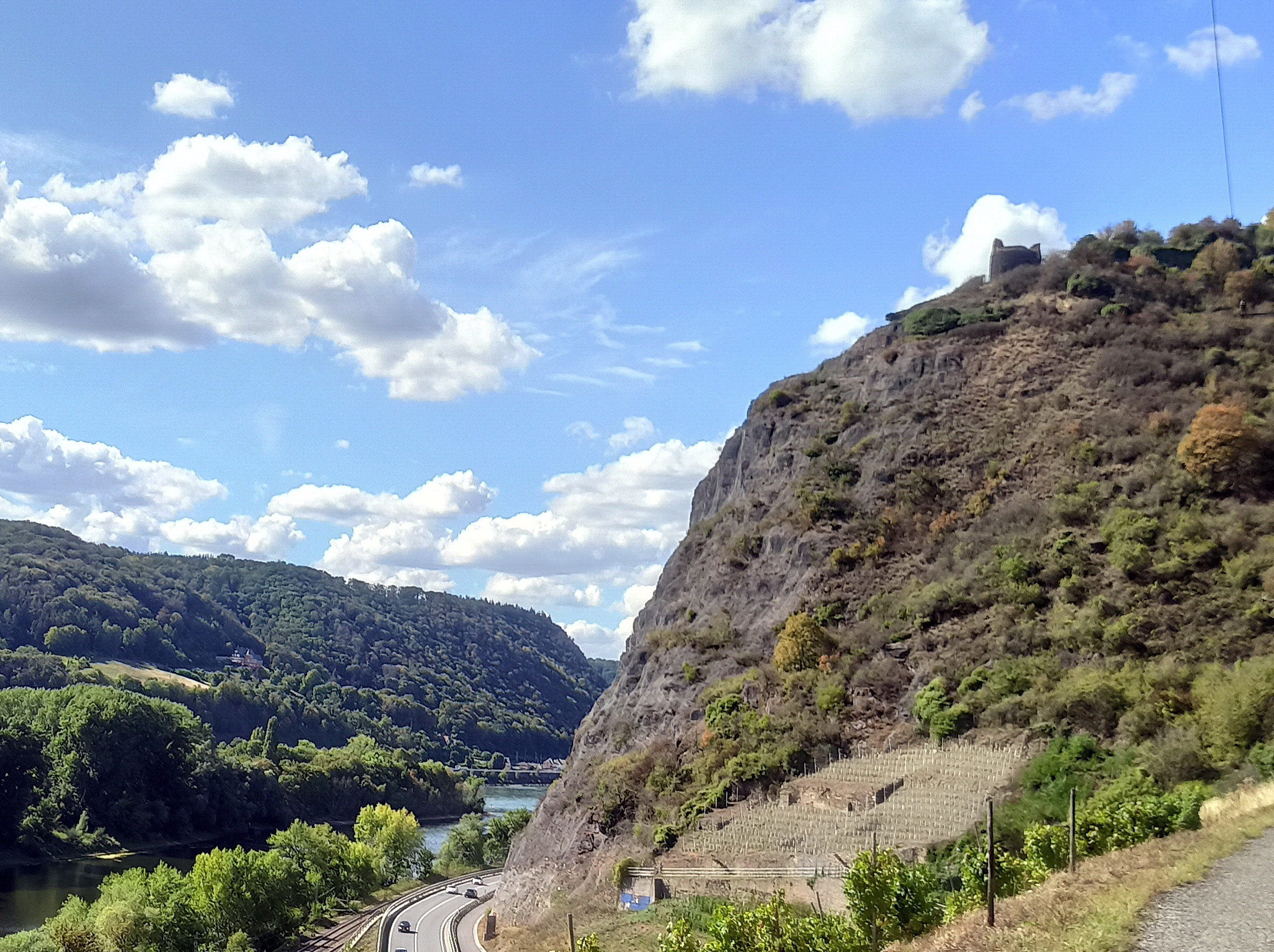
Ruins of Hammerstein castle on top of the hill overlocking the Rhine river

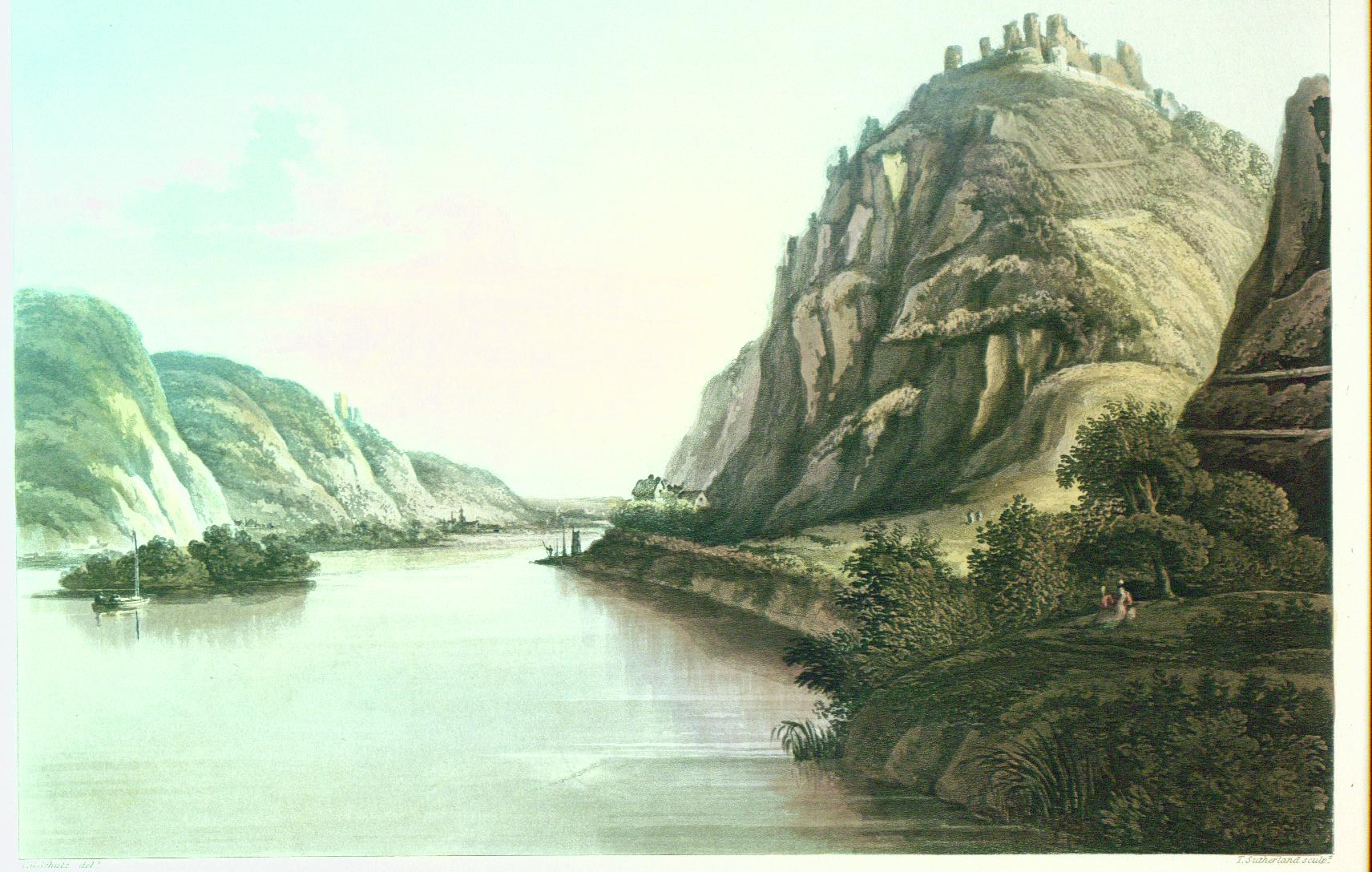
Hammerstein castle with Rhine river in ancient times

Hammerstein Castle (Burg Hammerstein) is the ruin of a 10th-century mountain castle in Rhineland-Palatinate, Germany, the oldest in this entire Middle Rhine Valley. The ruin of one of its watchtowers still overlooks the Rhine at an altitude of 195 m, near the village of Hammerstein. The Rheinsteig hiking trail passes close to the ruins which can be reached via a small path.

== Geographical location ==
The ruins are situated on top of a hill on the east Rhine banks, south of the village of Hammerstein in the district of Neuwied in Rhineland-Palatinate, Germany. The federal road B 42 runs besides the hill within the valley.

== History ==
Built in the 10th century by the Conradines (the technique of filling the enclosure wall would even indicate a Roman origin), this castle is mentioned, in the year 1000, as an imperial castle (Reichsburg) of the Holy Roman Empire. The burgraves of Hammerstein lived and ruled here until around 1417, before the genealogical traces of this family were lost.

The place is known, among other things, for the story of Otto von Hammerstein, Count of Engersgau, who entered into a marriage with his distant relative (in the 7th degree) Ermengarde de Verdun, daughter of Godfrey the Captive, Count of Verdun, and Mathilde de Saxony († 1008). This espousal was not recognized by the church and considered illegal. Complications ensued between 1018 and 1027, involving Archbishop Erkanbald of Mainz and even Holy Roman Emperor Henry II. Otto did not abide by the decision to dissolve his marriage with Ermengarde and went after the archbishop of Mainz in 1018. He captured the entourage of the latter and holds those people on his castle of Hammerstein. The castle was then successfully besieged by Emperor Henry II in the autumn of 1020. On December 26, starving, the defenders gave up the castle. Hammerstein Castle then fell into disrepair.

Later in 1071, Emperor Henry IV restored Hammerstein Castle and had the regalia of the Holy Roman Empire stored there, which are the insignia and ornaments of the sovereign elected to head the Holy Roman Empire. His son Henry V, who dethroned him in 1125, also deposited these important insignia and ornaments of the empire at the castle of Hammerstein.

Hammerstein remained an imperial castle until 1374 when Emperor Charles IV transmitted the feudal sovereignty of the place to the Electorate of Trier.
