= Bettel, Luxembourg =

Coordinates: 49°55′N 6°14′E

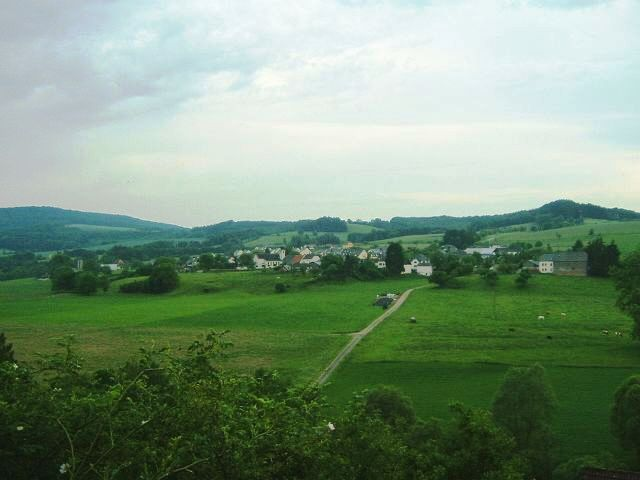
View of Bettel from the German border

Bettel (German pronunciation: [ˈbɛtl̩]; Luxembourgish: Bëttel) is a village in the commune of Tandel, in north-eastern Luxembourg. As of September 2026, the village had a population of 400.

Until 1 January 2006, Bettel was part of the commune of Fouhren, which was merged with the commune of Bastendorf to form the modern commune of Tandel.

Bettel is situated on the river Our, just opposite the German border and the village of Roth an der Our.

== Image gallery ==
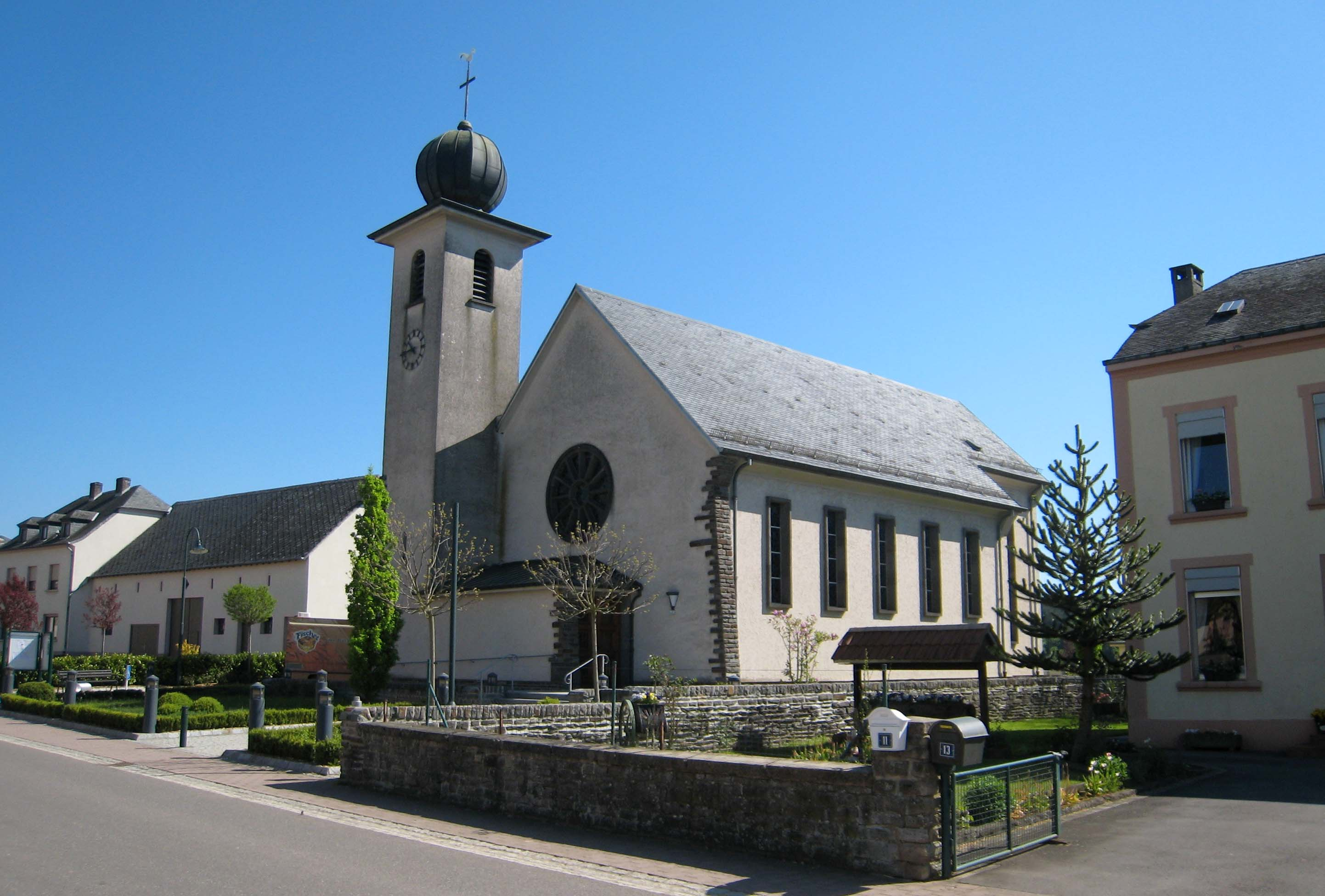
Church in Bettel
