= Butterpfad =

Hiking trail in Rhineland-Palatinate, Germany

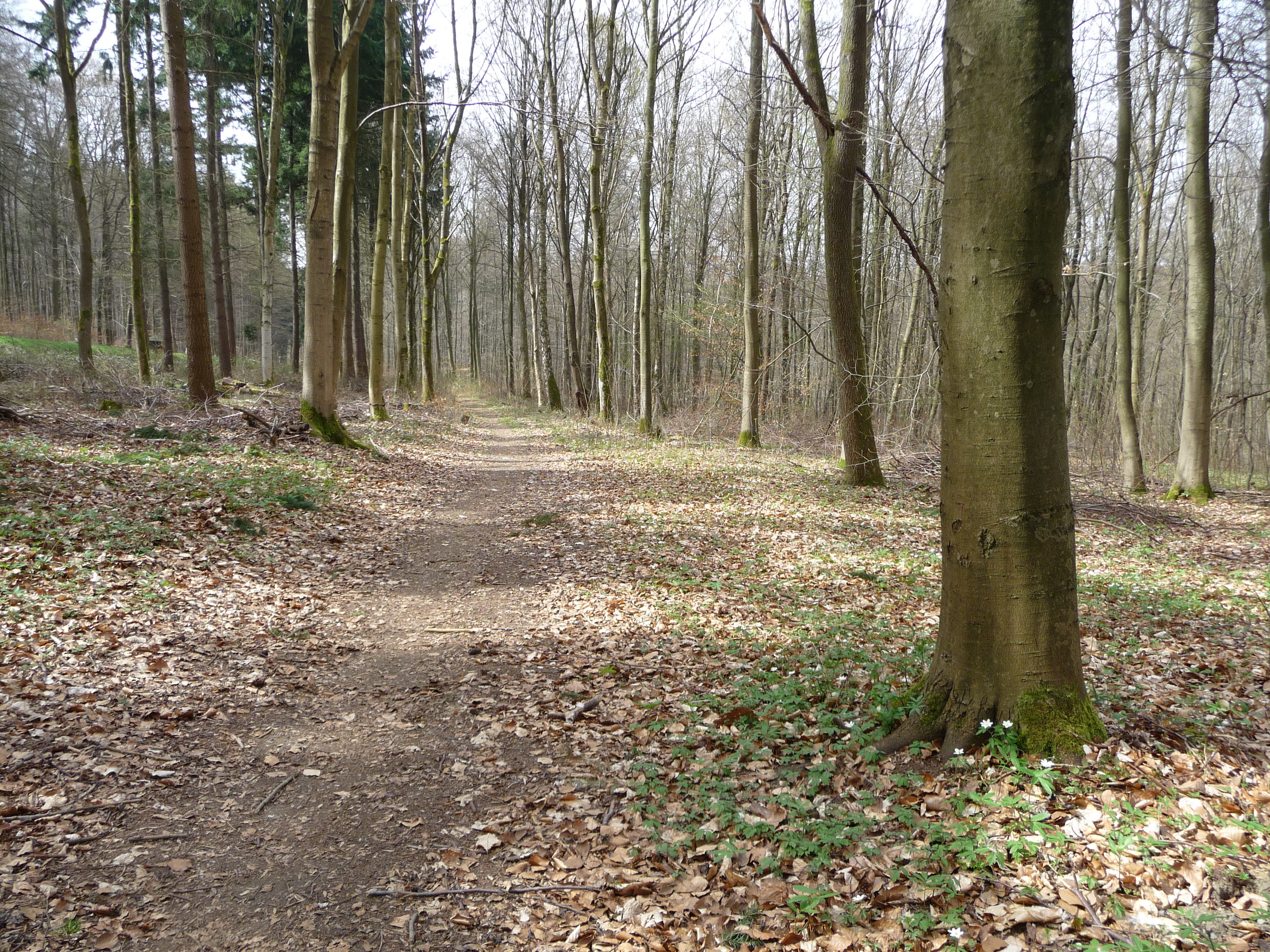
- The Butterpfad heading to the Obere Mühle, Rengsdorf
- Length: 12 km (7.5 mi)
- Location: Rhineland-Palatinate, Germany
- Trailheads: St.-Kastor Chapel Rengsdorf, Hümmerich
- Use: Hiking
- Elevation change: 574 m (1,883 ft)
- Highest point: Straßenhaus, 386 m (1,266 ft)
- Lowest point: Hümmerich, 241 m (791 ft)
- Difficulty: Easy
- Season: All year
- Sights: Sequoia forest
- Website: https://www.strassenhaus.de/downloadbereich/flyer_butterpfad_2018_web.pdf

The Butterpfad is a hiking trail in Rhineland-Palatinate, Germany. The trail is 12 km (7.5 mi) long and connects Rengsdorf via Straßenhaus with Hümmerich leading through the Westerwald forest.

== History ==
The Butterpfad dates back to the time that farmers of the region transported their goods, mainly butter and milk, via this route to Neuwied, where they sold their goods at the market. The trail is marked with red-white waymarks and along the trail information tables are located, providing background information on the history of this activity.

== Description ==
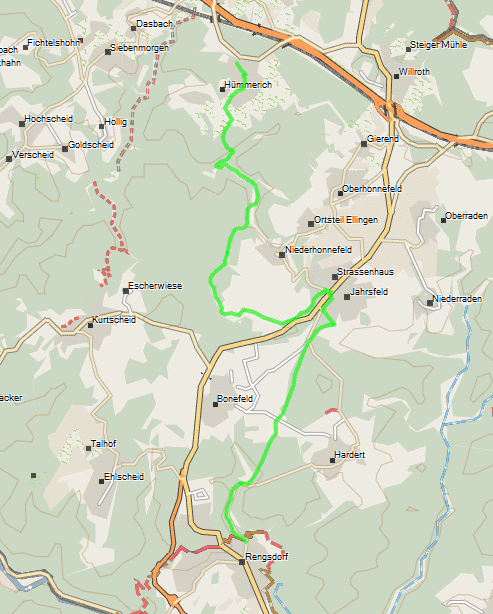
Butterpfad

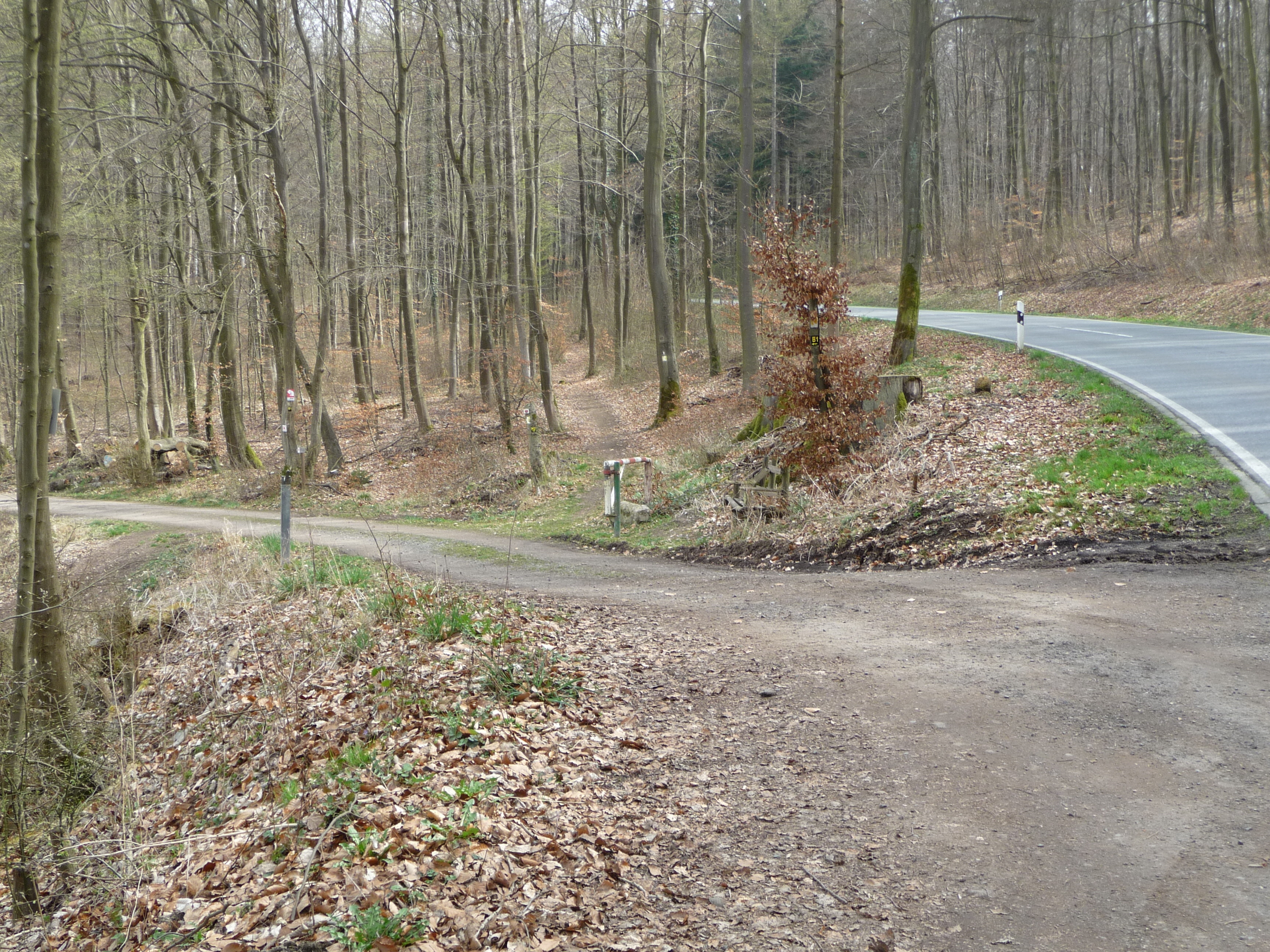
The small Butterpfad near the parking lot in the vicinity of the Obere Mühle, Rengsdorf, to the right the street to Hardert, to the left another hiking trail

In earlier times the trail lead not only from Hümmerich to Rengsdorf but continued through the Alte Scheid to Oberbieber (nowadays a district of Neuwied) and from there by tram to the market in Neuwied. The trail connects not only Rengsdorf with Hümmerich but also the WesterwaldSteig in Obersteinebach via a 4.2 km (2.6 mi) long path from Hümmerich with the Rheinsteig and the Klosterweg in Rengsdorf.

From its starting point at the St.-Kastor Chapel in Rengsdorf, the trail follows the Völkerwiesenbach valley through beech grove to the hut Philippsruhe at the Kreisstraße 105. Crossing this street, the trail passes Bonefeld in the direction of Straßenhaus. There is the option to follow a small detour to the Alteburg Bonefeld, a monument of the Middle Ages, and the Keltengräber (Celtic graves). The trail crosses the K105, and goes along a replica of a charcoal production hill and through the sequoia forest, then crossing the B256 in Straßenhaus. The trail follows the direction Schöne Aussicht, with a view on the pit frame of the abandoned Grube Georg, and leads through the Fockenbach valley in the direction Hümmericher Mühle (Hümmerich mill). Passing the Alexander gallery and the quarry Louisenglück, after a final rise the trail reaches Hümmerich with its weighing scale museum.
