= Brandenbourg =

Village in Tandel, Luxembourg

Coordinates: 49°55′N 6°08′E

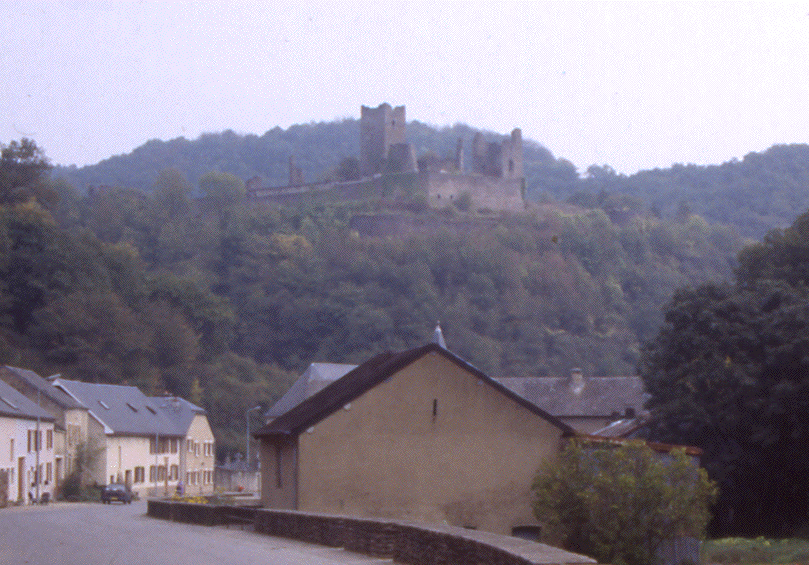
Village and Brandenbourg Castle

Brandenbourg (Luxembourgish: Branebuerg; German: Brandenburg [ˈbʁandn̩bʊʁk]) is a village in the commune of Tandel, in north-eastern Luxembourg. It lies in the valley of the Blees river, and is the site of the 10th century Brandenbourg Castle. As of September 2026, the village had a population of 329.

Until 1 January 2006, Brandenbourg was part of the commune of Bastendorf, which was merged with the commune of Fouhren to form the modern commune of Tandel.
