= Landscheid, Luxembourg =

Village in Luxembourg

Coordinates: 49°55′27″N 6°07′42″E

Landscheid Laaschent
- Village
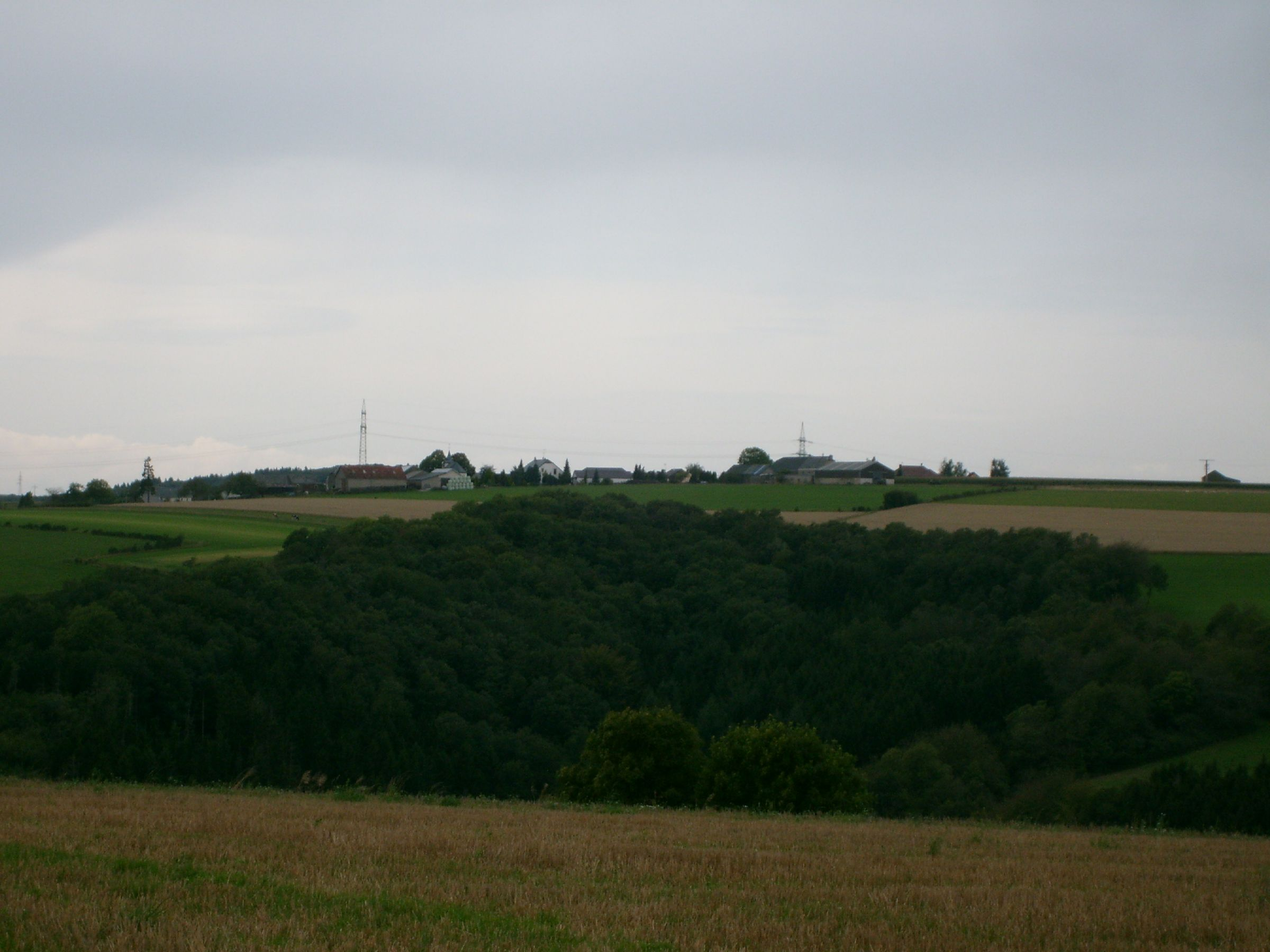
- Skyline of Landscheid
- Interactive map of Landscheid
- Country: Luxembourg
- Canton: Vianden
- Commune: Tandel

Population
  - Total: 109
- Time zone: UTC+1 (CET)
  - Summer (DST): UTC+2 (CEST)

Landscheid (German pronunciation: [ˈlantˌʃaɪt]; Luxembourgish: Laaschent) is a village in northeastern Luxembourg.

It is situated in the commune of Tandel and has a population of 110 as of 2026.
