= Bivels =

Coordinates: 49°57′33″N 6°11′30″E

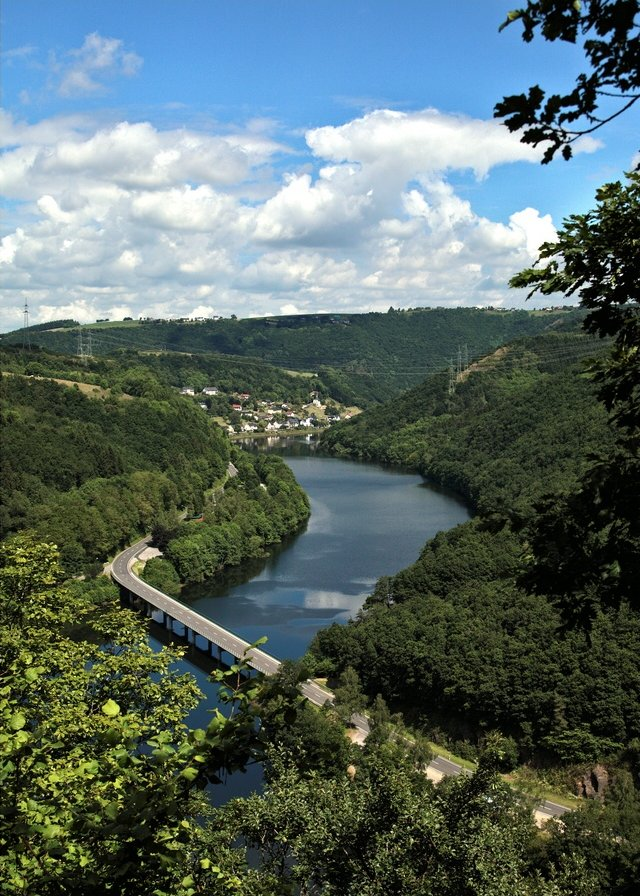
Bivels

Bivels (Luxembourgish: Biwels) is a small village in the commune of Putscheid, in the canton of Vianden, in north-eastern Luxembourg. As of 2026, it had 137 inhabitants.

The village is located about 3 km north of Vianden along a 7 km long artificial lake. Once a poor farming village, it now benefits from the nearby hydroelectric power plant. In the 1960s, when the dam was built, the lower part of the village was flooded. New housing and a church had to be rebuilt on higher ground overlooking the lake and the wooded hills beyond. The area is popular with tourists, especially hikers.
