= Blees =

River in Luxembourg

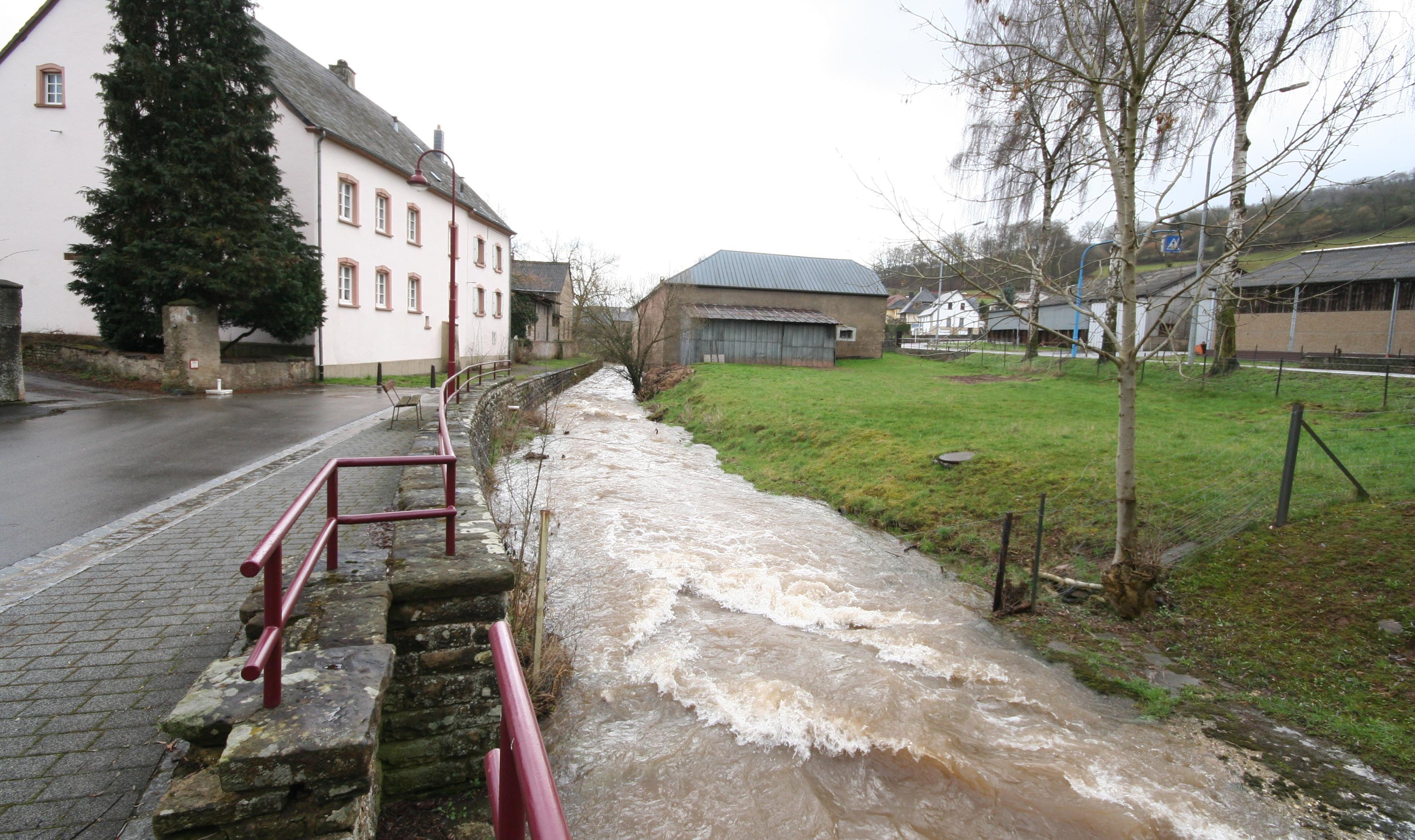

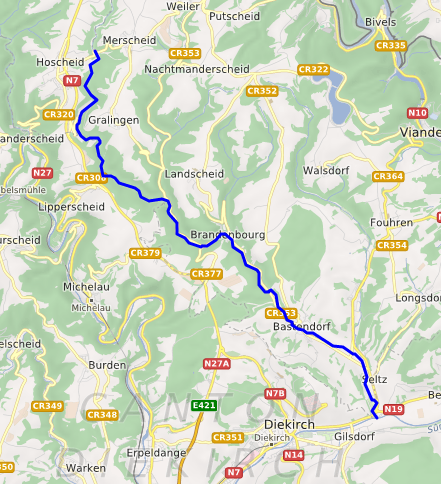

Location
- Country: Luxembourg

Physical characteristics
- Source
  - location: Hosingen-Dickt
  - elevation: 500 m (1,600 ft)
- Mouth: Sauer
  - location: Bleesbruck
  - coordinates: 49.8708°N 6.1899°E
- Length: 14 km (8.7 mi)

Basin features
- Progression: Sauer→ Moselle→ Rhine→ North Sea

The Blees is a river flowing through Luxembourg. It flows through the towns of Hosingen, Brandenbourg, and Bastendorf, before joining the Sauer at Bleesbruck.
