= Putscheid =

Putscheid Pëtschent
- Commune
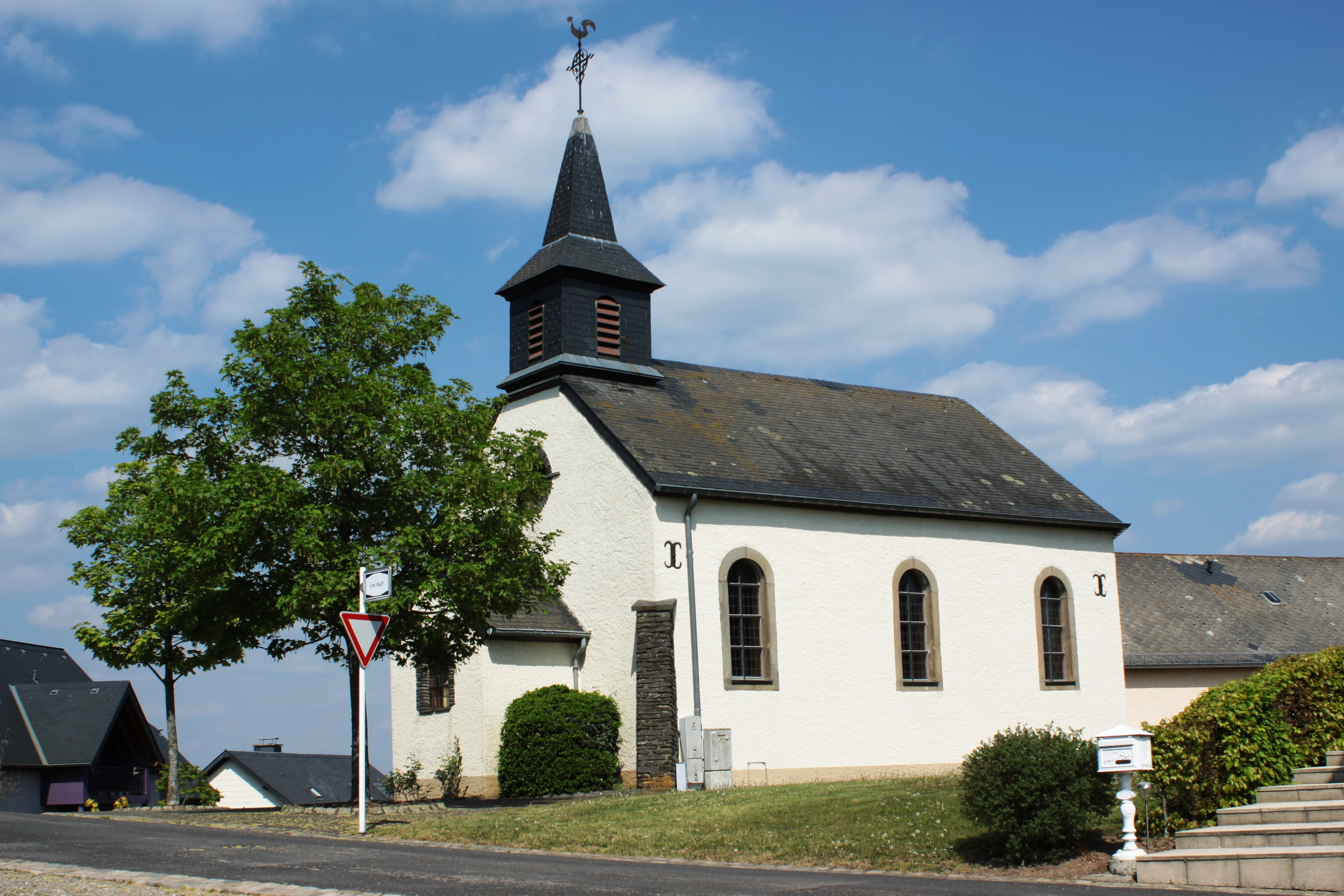
- Putscheid chapel

- Coat of arms

- Map of Luxembourg with Putscheid highlighted in orange, and the canton in dark red
- Coordinates: 50°N 6.1°E
- Country: Luxembourg
- Canton: Vianden

Government
  - Mayor: Fabienne Huberty

Area
  - Total: 27.13 km^{2} (10.47 sq mi)
  - Rank: 33rd of 100
- Highest elevation: 542 m (1,778 ft)
  - Rank: 5th of 100
- Lowest elevation: 226 m (741 ft)
  - Rank: 39th of 100

Population (2026)
  - Total: 1,201
  - Rank: 99th of 100
  - Density: 44.27/km^{2} (114.7/sq mi)
  - Rank: 99th of 100
- Time zone: UTC+1 (CET)
  - Summer (DST): UTC+2 (CEST)
- LAU 2: LU0000902
- Website: putscheid.lu

Putscheid (Luxembourgish: Pëtschent; German: Pütscheid [ˈpʏtʃaɪt]) is a commune and village in north-eastern Luxembourg. It is part of the canton of Vianden.

As of September 2026, the village of Putscheid, which lies in the centre of the commune, has a population of 114. Other villages within the commune include Bivels, Gralingen, Merscheid, Nachtmanderscheid, Stolzembourg, and Weiler.

== Population ==
Historical population

Year	Pop.	±%
1821	780	—
1851	1,109	+42.2%
1900	1,071	−3.4%
1910	1,053	−1.7%
1922	990	−6.0%
1935	921	−7.0%

Year	Pop.	±%
1947	775	−15.9%
1960	1,034	+33.4%
1970	660	−36.2%
1981	600	−9.1%
1990	628	+4.7%
2000	714	+13.7%

Year	Pop.	±%
2005	822	+15.1%
2010	958	+16.5%
2015	1,070	+11.7%
2020	1,150	+7.5%
2021	1,107	−3.7%

Source data
