= Nachtmanderscheid =

Village in Luxembourg

Coordinates: 49.9476°N 6.1279°E

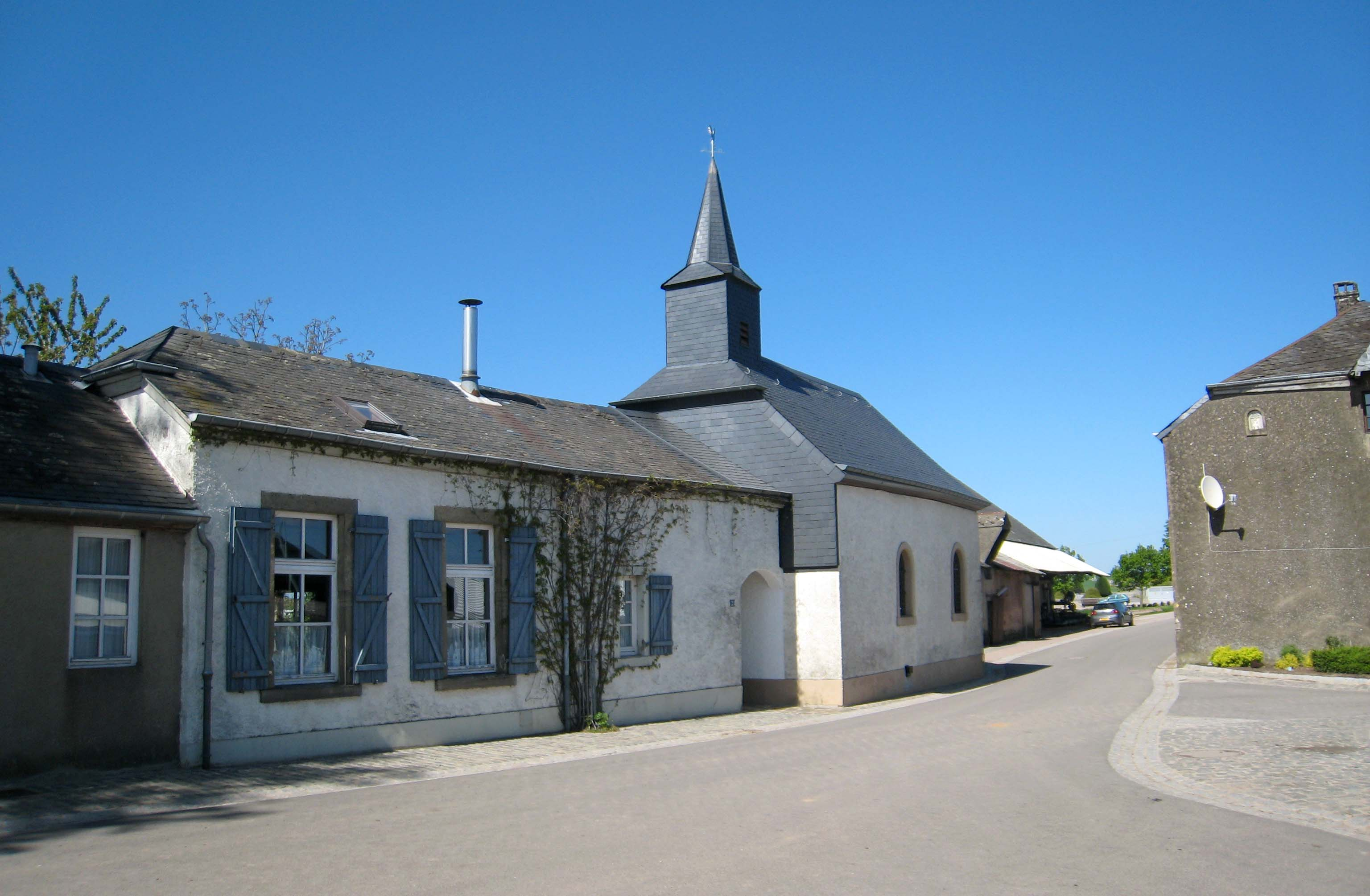
Nachtmanderscheid

Nachtmanderscheid (German pronunciation: [ˈnaxtˌmandɐʃaɪt]; Luxembourgish: Nuechtmanescht) is a village in the commune of Putscheid, Luxembourg. It had a population of 103 as of September 2026.
