= University Medical Center of Johannes Gutenberg University Mainz =

Teaching hospital in Rhineland-Palatinate, Germany

University Medical Center of the Johannes Gutenberg University Mainz

Geography
- Location: Mainz, Rhineland-Palatinate, Germany
- Coordinates: 49°59′33.341″N 8°15′28.437″E

Organisation
- Care system: Tertiary Care
- Affiliated university: Johannes Gutenberg University Mainz

Services
- Beds: ~1,600

History
- Founded: 1952

Links
- Website: www.unimedizin-mainz.de

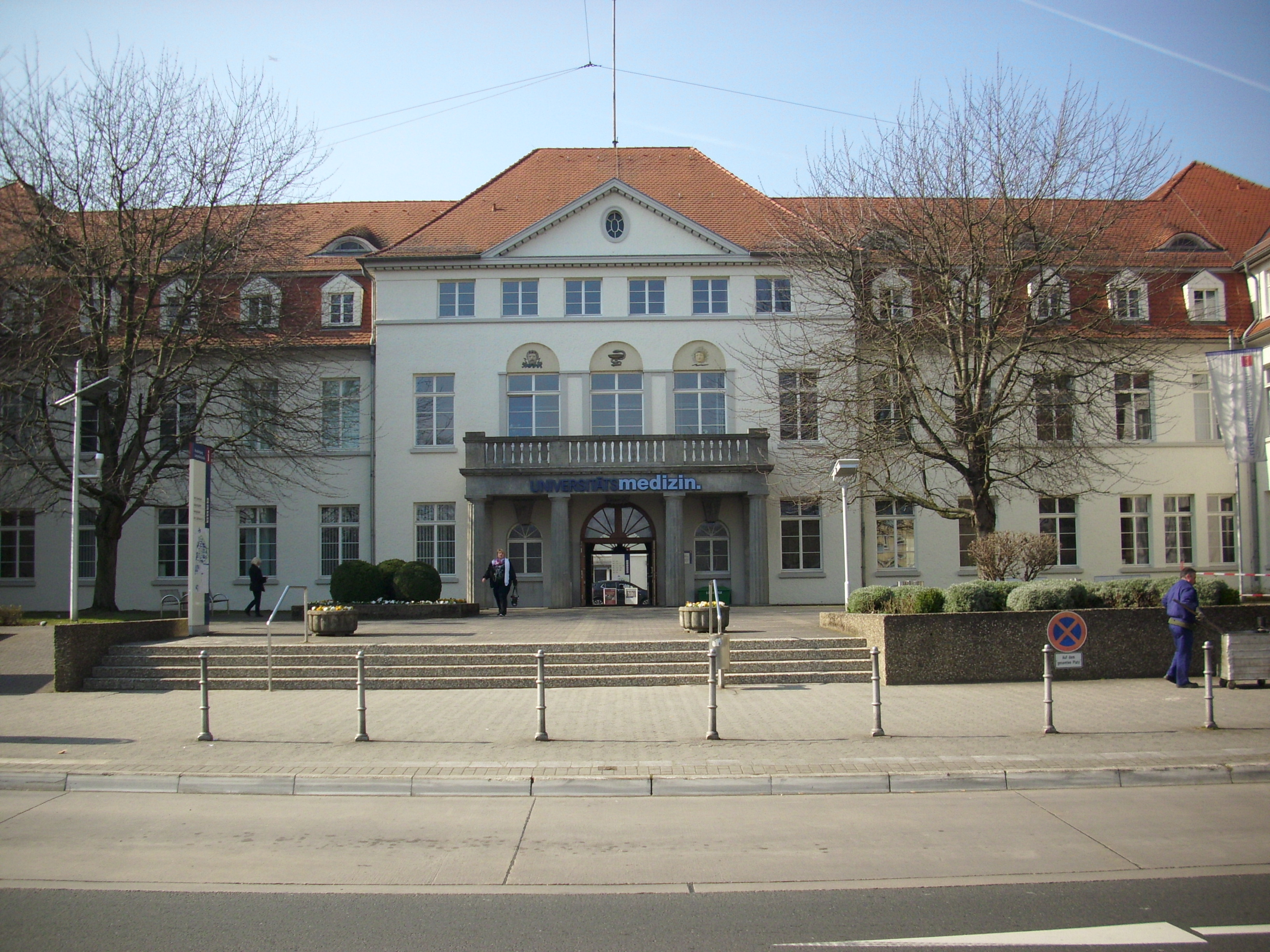
University Medical Center of Johannes Gutenberg University Mainz - Main entrance

The University Medical Center of the Johannes Gutenberg University Mainz (German: Universitätsmedizin der Johannes Gutenberg-Universität Mainz) is the primary teaching hospital in Rhineland-Palatinate, Germany. It serves as a tertiary care facility affiliated with the Johannes Gutenberg University Mainz and is a significant center for medical education, research, and patient care in the region.

== Overview ==
The University Medical Center encompasses more than 60 specialized clinics, institutes, and departments, supported by central facilities including a pharmacy and a transfusion center. Employing approximately 8,700 staff, it ranks among the largest employers in Rhineland-Palatinate. The institution operates around 1,600 beds and manages a substantial volume of patient care, with 276,163 outpatient cases and 61,358 inpatient cases recorded in 2023.

The center provides education for over 3,600 students in medicine and dentistry and offers vocational training for approximately 630 apprentices in healthcare professions, including nursing, speech therapy, dietetics, and midwifery, through eight training schools. Training programs also extend to administrative and technical fields.

== History ==
=== Origins ===
The foundation of the University Medical Center traces back to the Mainz municipal hospital, constructed between 1911 and 1914 on former fortress grounds in southwest Mainz, with an initial capacity of 750 beds. Efforts to establish a university hospital began in the 18th century, when the Mainz Elector and Archbishop Friedrich Karl Joseph von Erthal created a university fund in 1781 to support the Medical Faculty of the university, founded in 1477. Plans to convert the secularized Reichsklara convent into a hospital were initiated in 1784 but were later redirected to the Altmünster abbey. By 1790, ten patient rooms were completed, though their use remained limited. The university’s dissolution under French rule in 1798 halted further progress.

=== Post-War Development (1946–1952) ===
Following World War II, the university was reestablished in 1946 under the French occupation zone authorities, with the municipal hospital designated for medical research and teaching. A formal lease agreement for the hospital facilities was signed in 1950. During this period, the institution faced challenges, including inadequate infrastructure for medical education, such as a lack of lecture halls and student facilities.

=== University Hospital Period (1952–2008) ===
In 1952, the municipal hospital was officially designated a university hospital by the state of Rhineland-Palatinate, with the state acquiring ownership in 1959. Further expansions included new urology and orthopedic buildings (1989) and a pediatric clinic (1995), with the surgical building rebuilt by 1996.

=== University Medical Center (Since 2009) ===
In 2009, the university hospital and the Faculty of Medicine were integrated into the University Medical Center under the Rhineland-Palatinate University Medicine Act, forming a public corporation to strengthen collaboration in research, education, and clinical care.

=== Campus Redevelopment ===
The hospital’s campus, characterized by a fragmented layout, is undergoing a comprehensive redevelopment, with completion anticipated by 2038. Funded by €2.2 billion from Rhineland-Palatinate, the project includes a new central building to consolidate emergency services, outpatient clinics, operating theaters, and intensive care units. Demolition of older structures, including the aftercare clinic (Building 701), began in July 2023 to accommodate new laboratories, a pharmacy, kitchen, and storage facilities. Several historic buildings, such as the former boiler house and a professors’ villa, are also slated for demolition.
