= Gralingen =

- Commune
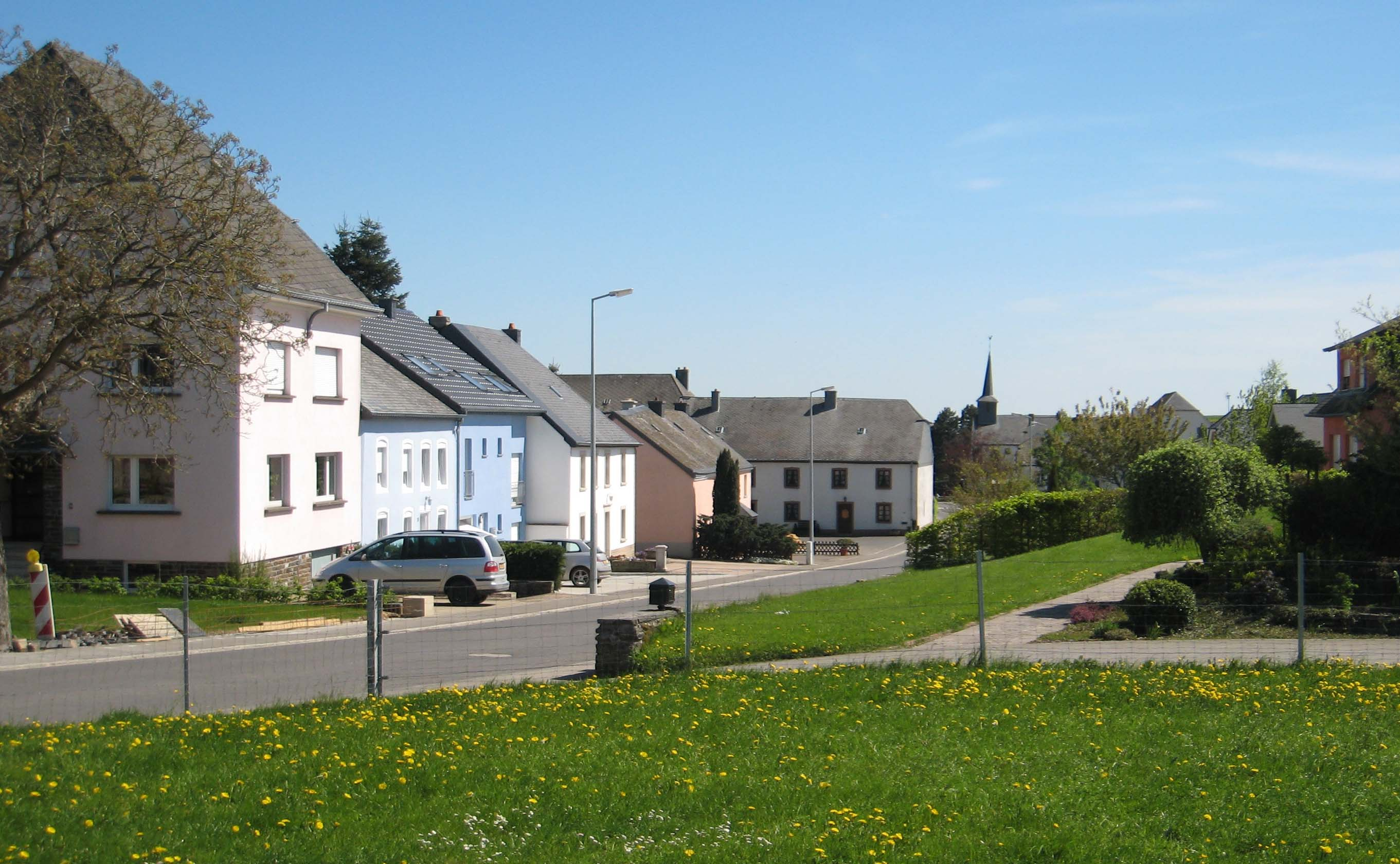

- Location within Luxembourg
- Coordinates: 49°56′N 6°06′E
- Country: Luxembourg
- Canton: Putscheid
- Time zone: UTC+1 (CET)
  - Summer (DST): UTC+2 (CEST)

Gralingen (German pronunciation: [ˈɡʁaːlɪŋən]; Luxembourgish: Grooljen) is a village in the commune of Putscheid, in north-eastern Luxembourg. As of September 2026, the village had a population of 240.
