= Hoscheid-Dickt =

Village in northern Luxembourg

Coordinates: 49.974°N 6.090°E

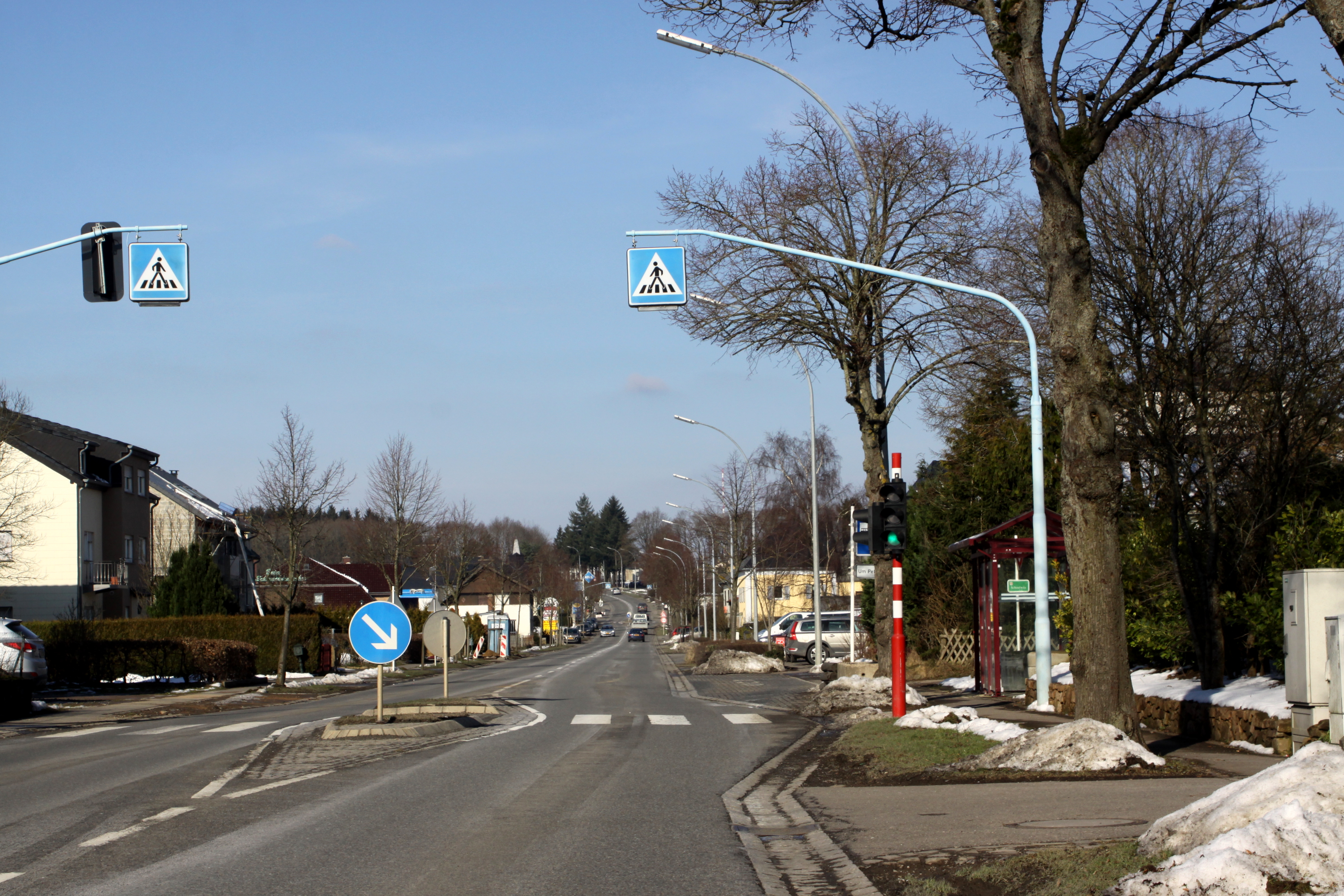
Street of Hoscheid-Dickt

Hoscheid-Dickt (Luxembourgish: Houschter-Déckt) is a village in the commune of Parc Hosingen, in northern Luxembourg. As of September 2026, the village has a population of 437. Nearby is the source of the Blees.

== See also ==
- List of villages in Luxembourg
