= Brandenbourg Castle =

Coordinates: 49°54′42″N 06°08′16″E

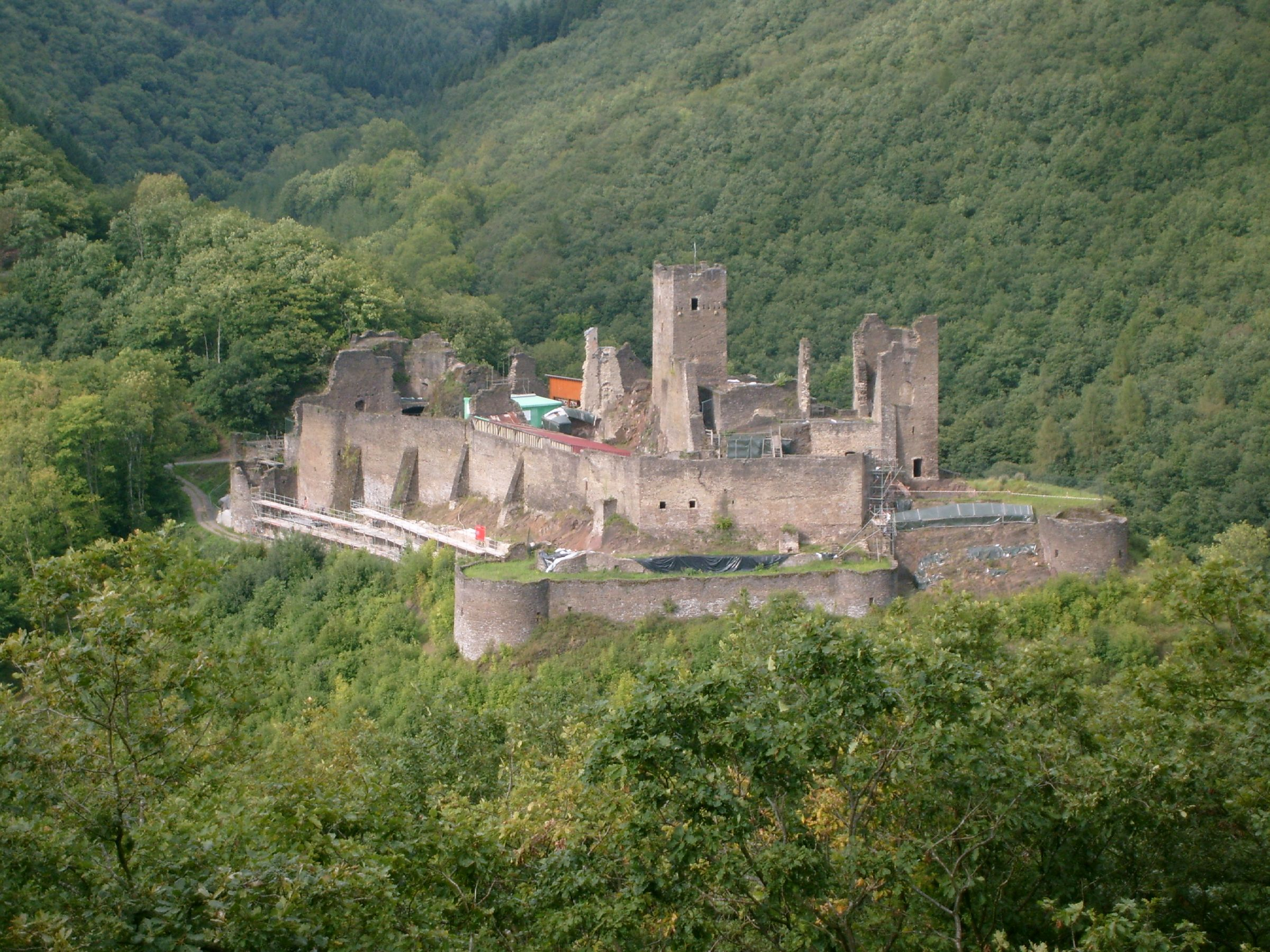
Brandenbourg Castle

Brandenbourg Castle (Luxembourgish: Buerg Branebuerg; French: Château de Brandenbourg; German: Burg Brandenbourg), now a ruin, is located on a promontory some 70 metres above the village of Brandenbourg in north-eastern Luxembourg. It has a history going back to the 9th and 10th centuries when there was a wooden fort on the site. The 13th century keep, now 11.9 metres high, used to have four floors, only three of which remain. Around 1687, the French destroyed the external walls of the castle which subsequently fell increasingly into ruin. It is now owned by the family du Fays - van Delft. The owner signed an emphyteutic lease (1997) with the State of Luxembourg permitting the state to take care of the castle (consolidation and archaeological excavation work).

== Location ==
The castle is located high above the crossroads of the road from the River Sûre up into the Ardennes and that from Bourscheid to Vianden. The site, measuring 35 by 95 metres, consists of the main castle and of a lower courtyard.

== History ==
Archaeological digs provide evidence of a wooden fort dating back to the 9th and 10th centuries. The first buildings of stone are from the 13th century. In the 14th century a chapel was added to the castle. During 15th and 16th century, when owned by the House of Salm, the castle was expanded and a bailey, two towers, vaulted cellars and curtain walls were added.

The castle was inhabited since the middle of the 18th century. Like many other medieval castles, it was then abandoned and left to fall into ruin. In 1936 and during the 1950s, the State carried out basic consolidation work with the permission of the owner. Since the 1980s, necessary consolidation work has been performed while archaeologists have continued to explore the site for further evidence of the castle's history.

== The castle today ==
The ruin is accessible to the public, between 9 am and 5 pm every day (closed from November to March).

== Gallery ==
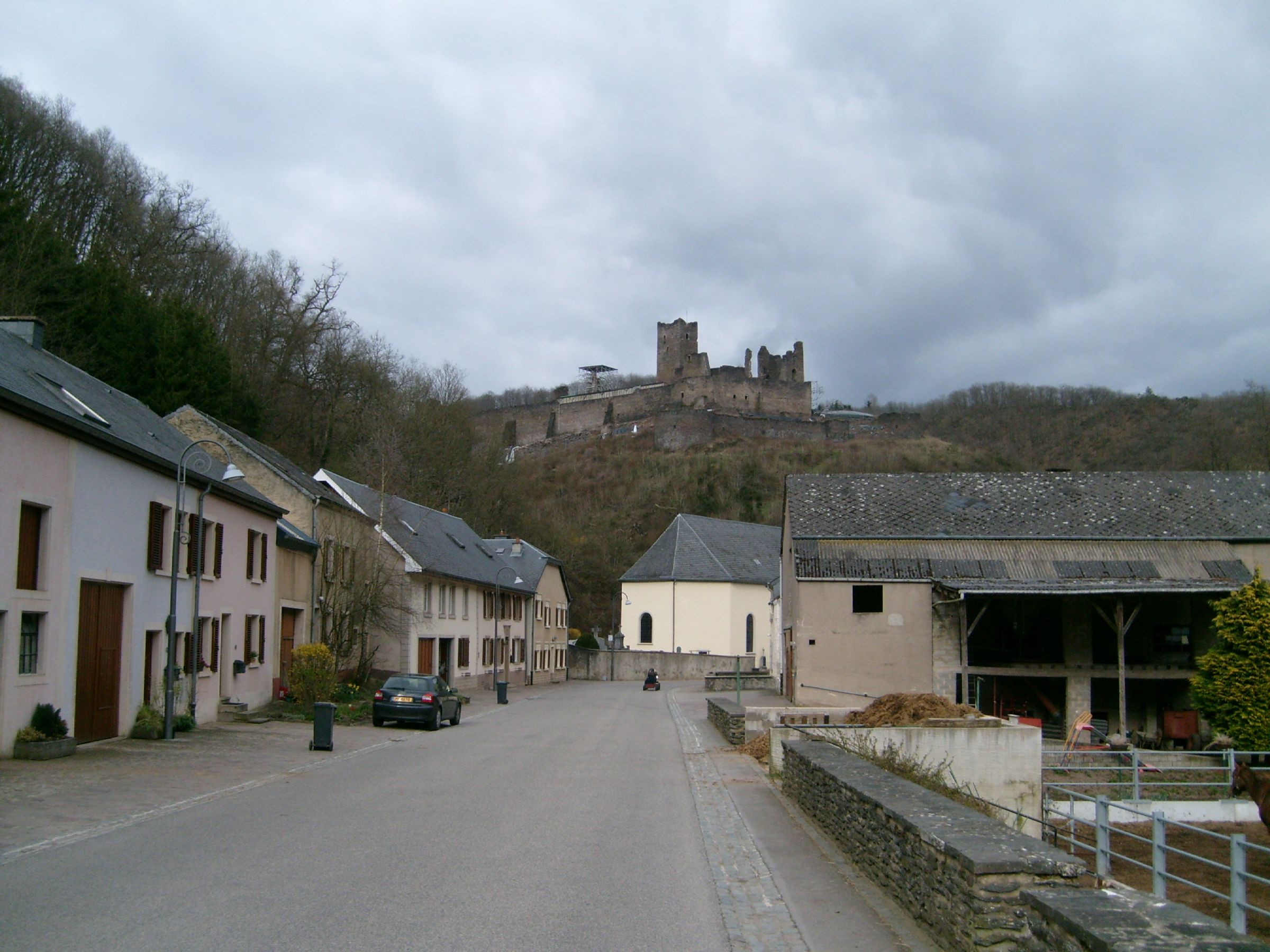
The castle high above the village

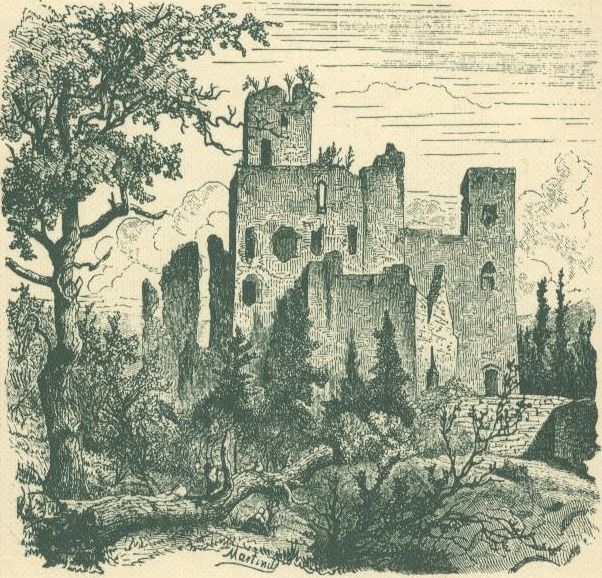
Drawing by Martinus-Antonius Kuytenbrower (1857)

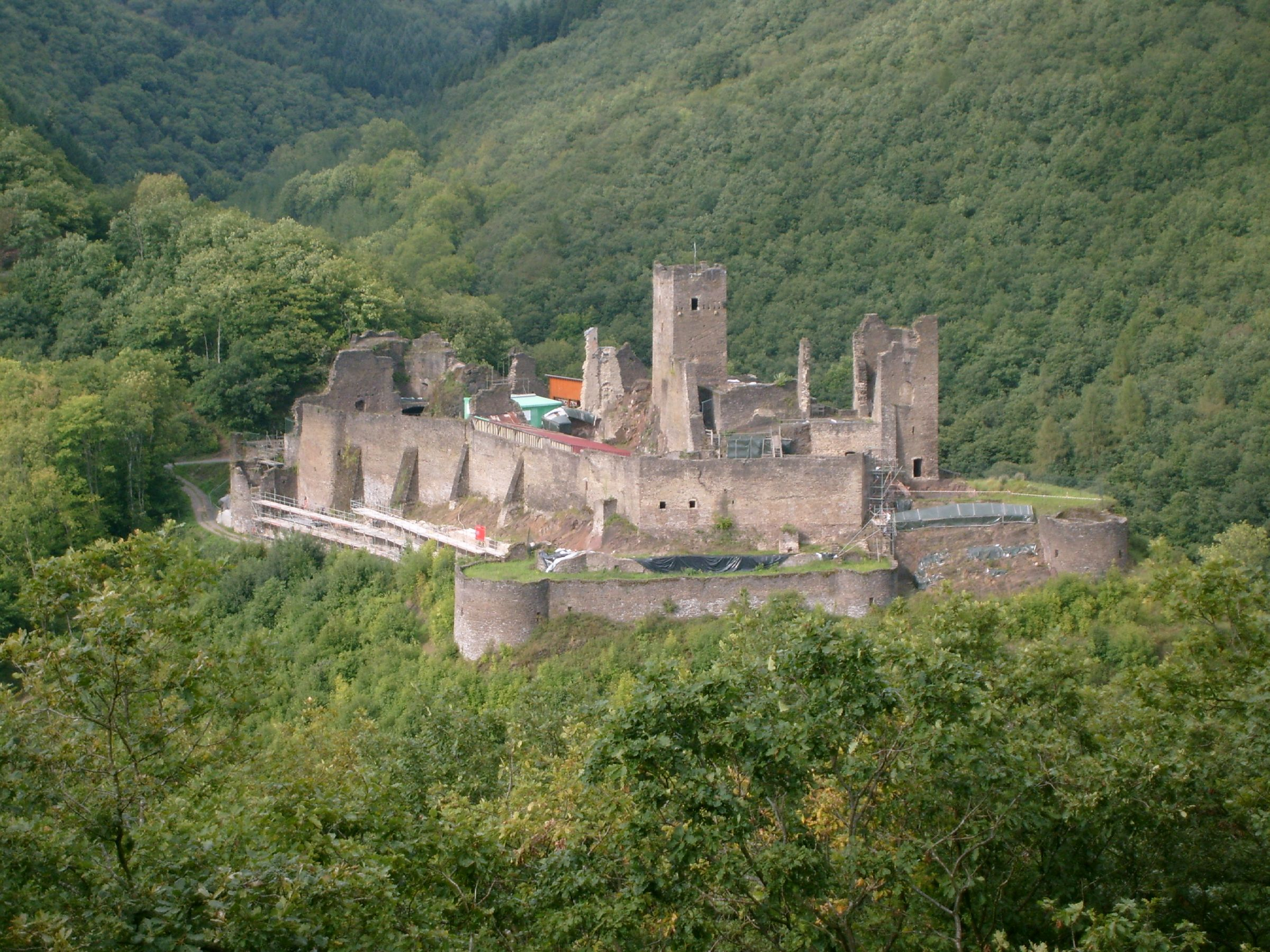
The castle from the south

== See also ==
- List of castles in Luxembourg
