= Klosterweg =

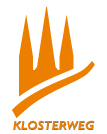
- Klosterweg waymark
- Length: 17 km (11 mi)
- Location: Rhineland-Palatinate, Germany
- Trailheads: Rengsdorf, Waldbreitbach
- Use: Hiking
- Elevation change: 1,513 m (4,964 ft)
- Highest point: Kurtscheid, 389 m (1,276 ft)
- Lowest point: Niederbreitbach, 130 m (430 ft)
- Difficulty: Easy
- Season: All year
- Website: http://www.der-klosterweg.de/

The Klosterweg is a hiking trail in Rhineland-Palatinate, Germany. The trail is 17 km (11 mi) long and connects Rengsdorf via Kurtscheid with Waldbreitbach leading through the Westerwald forest.

== Description ==
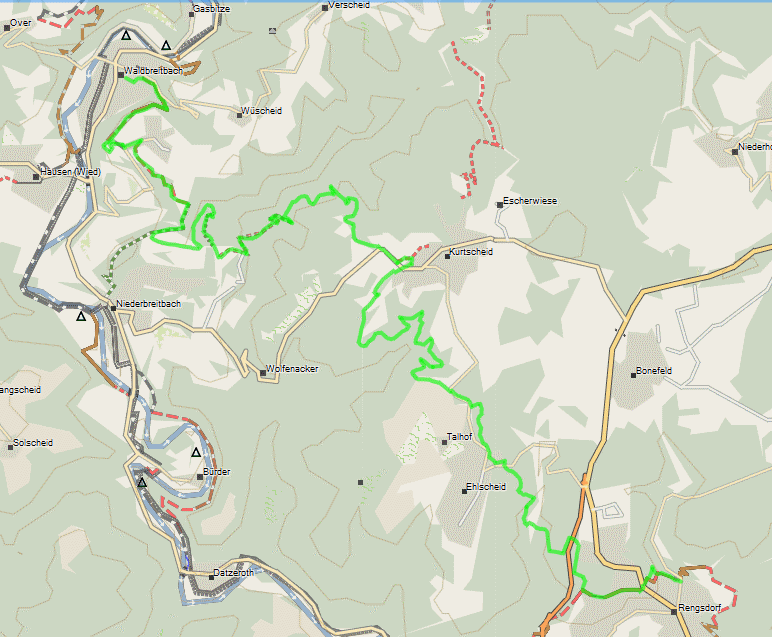
Klosterweg

Leading through the Rhine-Westerwald Nature Park the trail connects two popular long distance trails in Rhineland-Palatinate, the Rheinsteig in Rengsdorf and the Westerwald-Steig in Waldbreitbach. The trail was opened in May 2009. In October 2009 the Klosterweg received the quality label Premiumweg.

The Klosterweg leads along following sights:

- St. Kastor church in Rengsdorf
- Evangelic church in Rengsdorf
- Römergraben (a medieval landwehr in Rengsdorf)
- Spa park in Ehlscheid
- Church Heilige Schutzengel in Kurtscheid
- Mutter Rosa monument
- Fockenbach valley
- Church Maria Himmelfahrt in Waldbreitbach
