= Fouhren =

Coordinates: 49°55′N 6°12′E

Fouhren Furen
- Former commune of Luxembourg
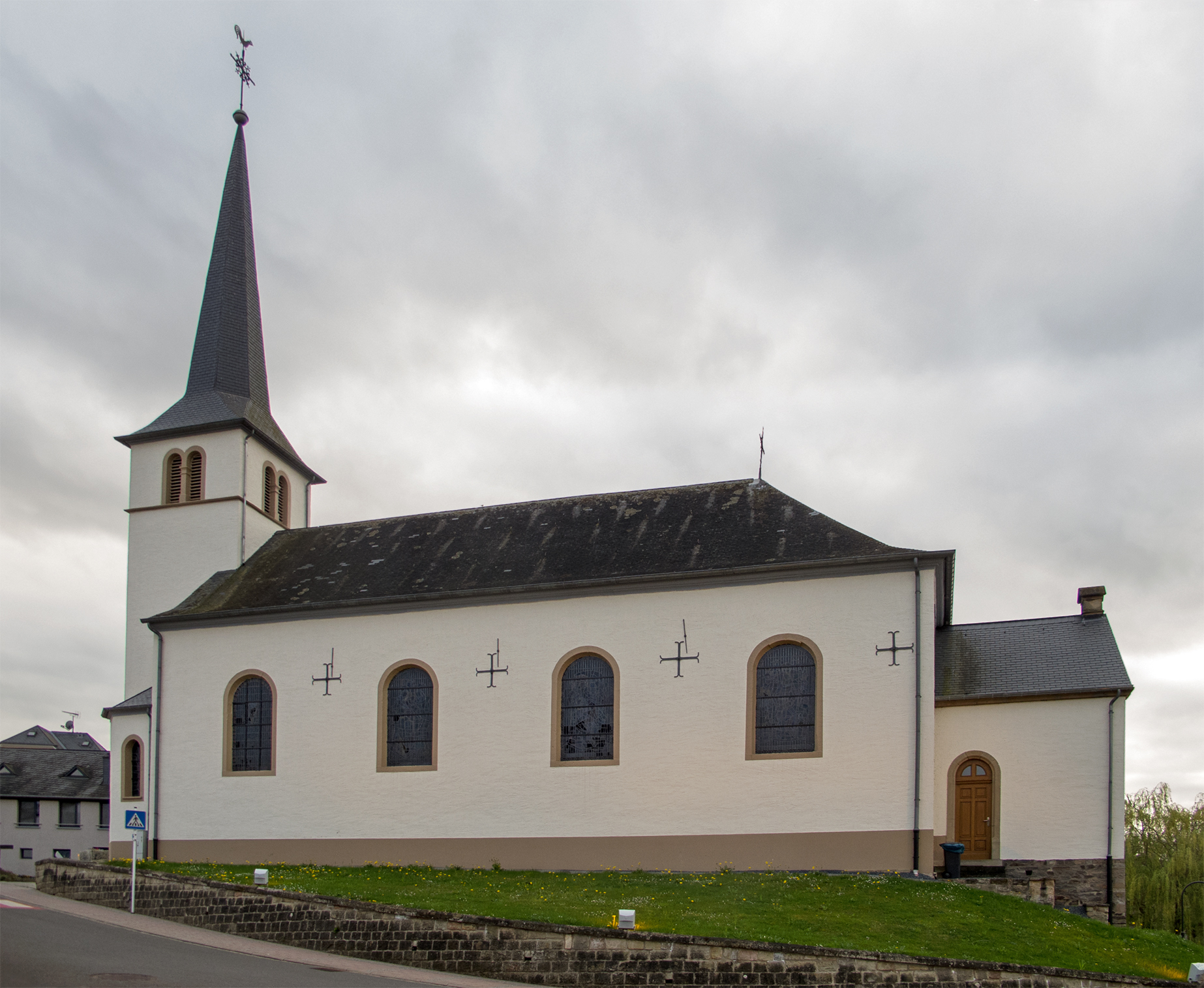
- Chapel in Fouhren
- Interactive map of Fouhren
- Country: Luxembourg
- District: Diekirch
- Canton: Vianden
- Created: Original commune
- Abolished: 1 January 2006
- Currently: Part of Tandel

Fouhren (Luxembourgish: Furen [ˈfuːɐ̯ʀən]; German: Fuhren [ˈfuːʁən]) is a small town in the commune of Tandel, in north-eastern Luxembourg. As of September 2026, the town has a population of 484.

Fouhren was a commune in the canton of Vianden until 1 January 2006, when it was merged with the commune of Bastendorf to form the new commune of Tandel. The law creating Tandel was passed on 21 December 2004.

== Villages ==
The former commune consisted of the villages:

- Bettel
- Fouhren
- Longsdorf
- Walsdorf
- Seltz
- Bleesbréck (lieu-dit)
- Marxberg (lieu-dit)
- Schmëttenhaff (lieu-dit)
