= Bastendorf =

Town and former commune in Luxembourg

Coordinates: 49°54′N 6°10′E

Bastendorf Baastendurf
- Former commune of Luxembourg
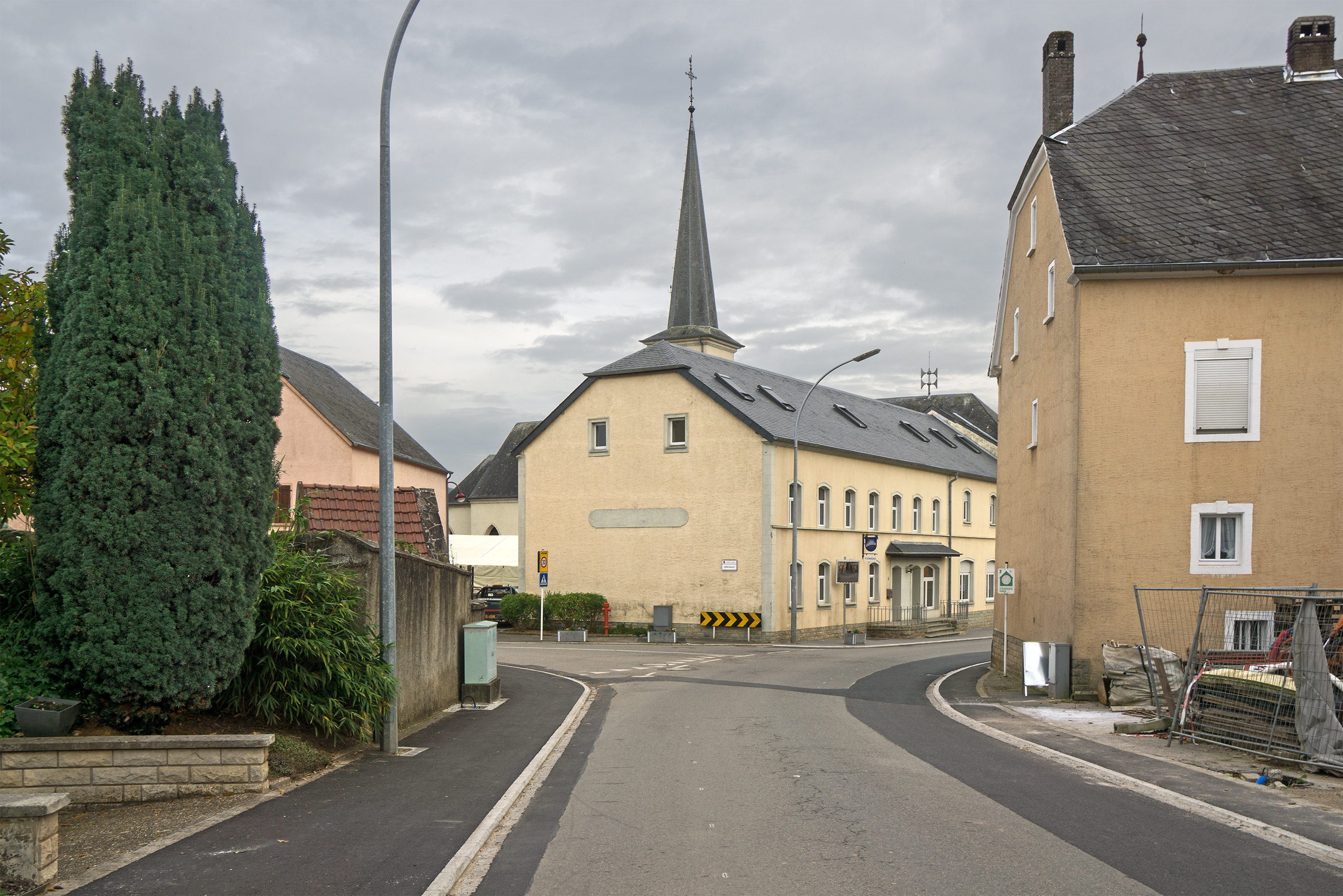

- Map of Luxembourg with Bastendorf highlighted in orange, and the canton in dark red
- Country: Luxembourg
- District: Diekirch
- Canton: Vianden
- Created: Original commune
- Abolished: 1 January 2006
- Currently: Part of Tandel

Bastendorf (German pronunciation: [ˈbastn̩ˌdɔʁf]; Luxembourgish: Baastenduerf) is a small town in the commune of Tandel, in north-eastern Luxembourg. As of September 2026, the town has a population of 642.

Bastendorf was a commune in the canton of Diekirch until 1 January 2006, when it was merged with the commune of Fouhren to form the new commune of Tandel, in Vianden. The law creating Tandel was passed on 21 December 2004.

== Former commune ==
The former commune consisted of the villages:

- Bastendorf
- Brandenbourg
- Landscheid
- Tandel
- Hoscheidterhof
- Këppenhaff
- Fischbacherhof (lieu-dit)
- Froehnerhof (lieu-dit)
- Ronnenbusch (lieu-dit)
