= Longsdorf =

Coordinates: 49.8975°N 6.2066°E

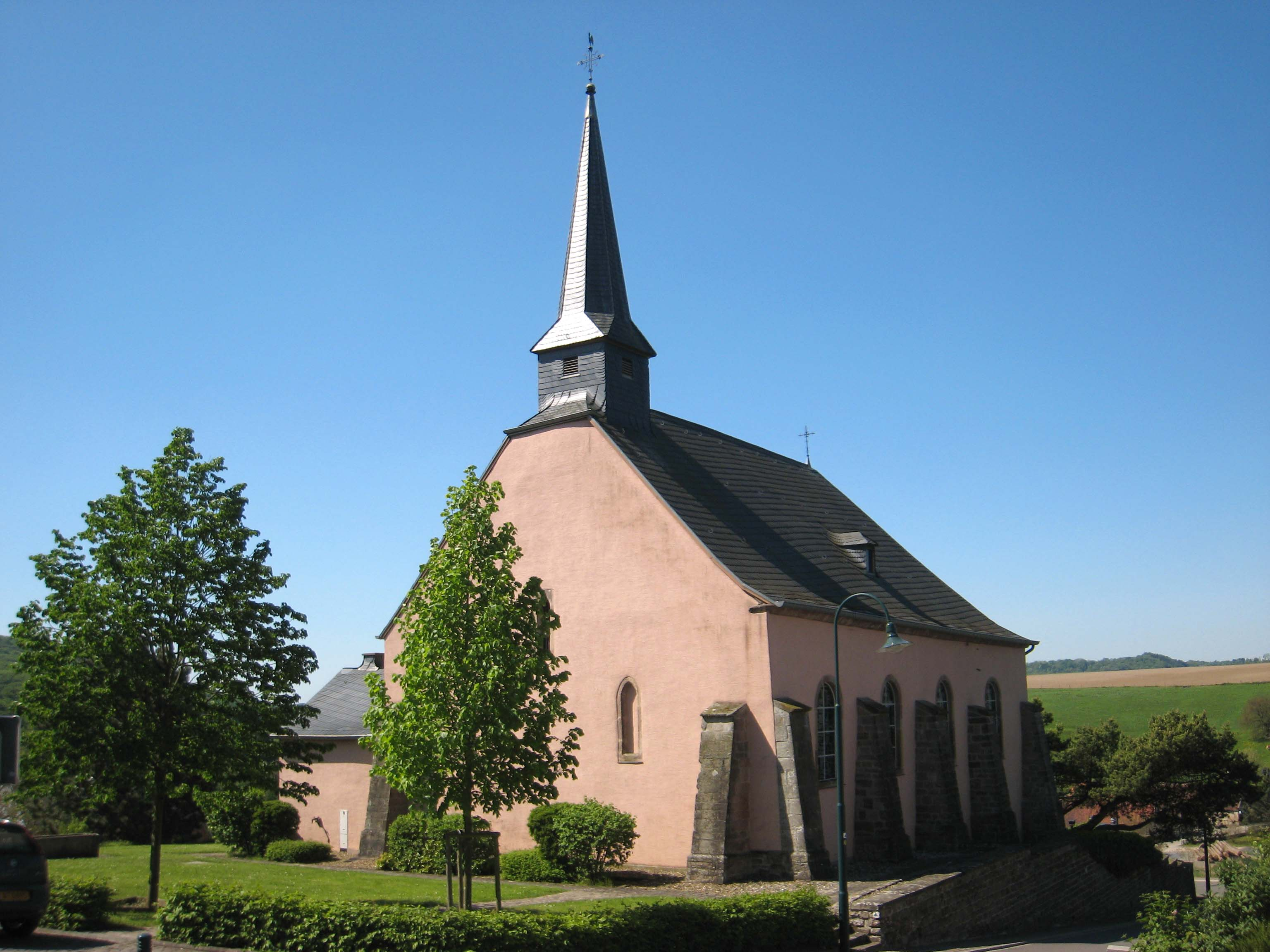
Church in Marxbierg (part of Longsdorf)

Longsdorf (German pronunciation: [ˈlɔŋsdɔʁf]; Luxembourgish: Longsdref) is a village in the commune of Tandel, Luxembourg. It had a population of 103 As of September 2026.

The hamlet of Marxbierg (or Marxberg) forms part of the village.
