= Tandel =

Tandel Tandel
- Commune
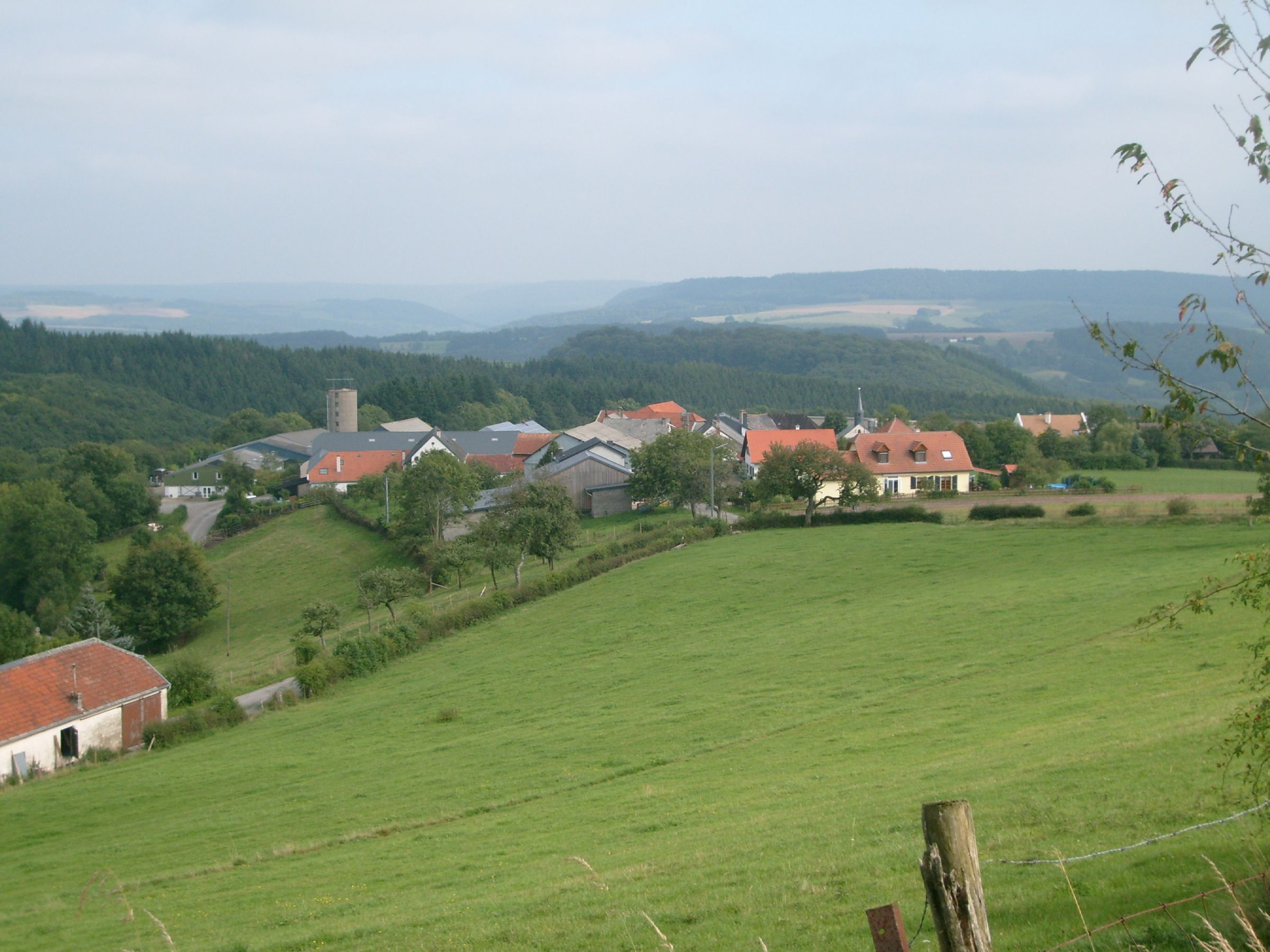

- Coat of arms

- Map of Luxembourg with Tandel highlighted in orange, and the canton in dark red
- Interactive map of Tandel
- Coordinates: 49.897°N 6.182°E
- Country: Luxembourg
- Canton: Vianden

Government
  - Mayor: Carole Gils

Area
  - Total: 41.72 km^{2} (16.11 sq mi)
  - Rank: 11th of 100
- Highest elevation: 537 m (1,762 ft)
  - Rank: 7th of 100
- Lowest elevation: 190 m (620 ft)
  - Rank: 21st of 100

Population (2026)
  - Total: 2,380
  - Rank: 72nd of 100
  - Density: 57.0/km^{2} (148/sq mi)
  - Rank: 93rd of 100
- Time zone: UTC+1 (CET)
  - Summer (DST): UTC+2 (CEST)
- LAU 2: LU0000901
- Website: tandel.lu

Tandel (German pronunciation: [ˈtandl̩]) is a commune and village in eastern Luxembourg, in the canton of Vianden. It lies close to the border with Germany. As of September 2026, the village of Tandel, which lies in the centre of the commune, has a population of 109.

== History ==
The commune of Tandel was formed on 1 January 2006 from the former communes of Bastendorf (in the canton of Diekirch) and Fouhren (in the canton of Vianden). The law creating Tandel was passed on 21 December 2004.

== Populated places ==
The commune consists of the following villages:

Bastendorf Section:

- Bastendorf
- Brandenbourg
- Landscheid
- Tandel
- Hoscheidterhof
- Këppenhaff
- Fischbacherhof (lieu-dit)
- Froehnerhof (lieu-dit)
- Ronnenbusch (lieu-dit)

Fouhren Section:

- Bettel
- Fouhren
- Longsdorf
- Walsdorf
- Seltz
- Bleesbréck (lieu-dit)
- Marxberg (lieu-dit)
- Schmëttenhaff (lieu-dit)

== Population ==
Historical population

Year	Pop.	±%
1821	1,264	—
1851	1,765	+39.6%
1900	1,675	−5.1%
1910	1,622	−3.2%
1922	1,523	−6.1%
1935	1,457	−4.3%

Year	Pop.	±%
1947	1,241	−14.8%
1960	1,137	−8.4%
1970	1,121	−1.4%
1981	1,177	+5.0%
1990	1,199	+1.9%
2000	1,367	+14.0%

Year	Pop.	±%
2005	1,567	+14.6%
2010	1,725	+10.1%
2015	1,889	+9.5%
2020	2,222	+17.6%
2021	2,214	−0.4%

Source data
