= Rhineland-Palatinate =

State in Germany

Rhineland-Palatinate Rheinland-Pfalz (German) Rhoilond-Palz (Palatine German)
- State
- Flag Seal Coat of arms Brandmark
- Coordinates: 49°54′47″N 7°27′0″E
- Country: Germany
- Founded: 30 August 1946
- Capital (and largest city): Mainz

Government
  - Body: Landtag of Rhineland-Palatinate
  - Minister-President: Gordon Schnieder (CDU)
  - Governing parties: CDU / SPD
  - Bundesrat votes: 4 (of 69)
  - Bundestag seats: 31 (of 630) (as of 2025)

Area
  - Total: 19,857.97 km^{2} (7,667.21 sq mi)

Population (31 December 2023)
  - Total: 4,174,311
  - Density: 210.2083/km^{2} (544.4371/sq mi)

GDP
  - Total: €185.270 billion (2025)
  - Per capita: €44,864 (2025)
- Time zone: UTC+1 (CET)
  - Summer (DST): UTC+2 (CEST)
- ISO 3166 code: DE-RP
- NUTS Region: DEB
- HDI (2022): 0.938 very high · 9th of 16
- Website: www.rlp.de

Rhineland-Palatinate (Note: /ˌraɪnlænd pəˈlætɪnɪt, -lənd-/ RYNE-land pə-LAT-in-it, -lənd- US also /-ɪneɪt/ -in-ayt) (German: Rheinland-Pfalz [ˌʁaɪnlant ˈpfalts]; Palatine German: Rhoilond-Palz) is a landlocked state in western Germany. It covers 19,846 km^{2} (7,663 sq mi) and has about 4.05 million residents. It is the ninth largest and sixth most populous of the sixteen states. Mainz is the capital and largest city. Other cities are Ludwigshafen am Rhein, Koblenz, Trier, Kaiserslautern, Worms, and Neuwied. It is bordered by North Rhine-Westphalia, Saarland, Baden-Württemberg and Hesse and by France, Luxembourg and Belgium.

Rhineland-Palatinate was established in 1946 after World War II, from parts of the former states of Prussia (part of its Rhineland and Nassau provinces), Hesse (Rhenish Hesse) and Bavaria (its former outlying Palatinate kreis or district), by the French military administration in Allied-occupied Germany. Rhineland-Palatinate became part of the Federal Republic of Germany in 1949 and shared the country's only border with the Saar Protectorate until the latter was returned to German control in 1957. Rhineland-Palatinate's natural and cultural heritage includes the extensive Palatinate winegrowing region, picturesque landscapes, and many castles and palaces.

== History ==
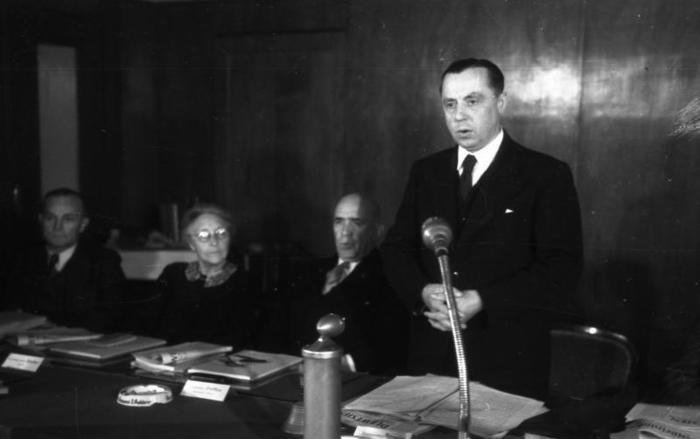
Minister-president Peter Altmeier at the Rittersturz Conference in 1948

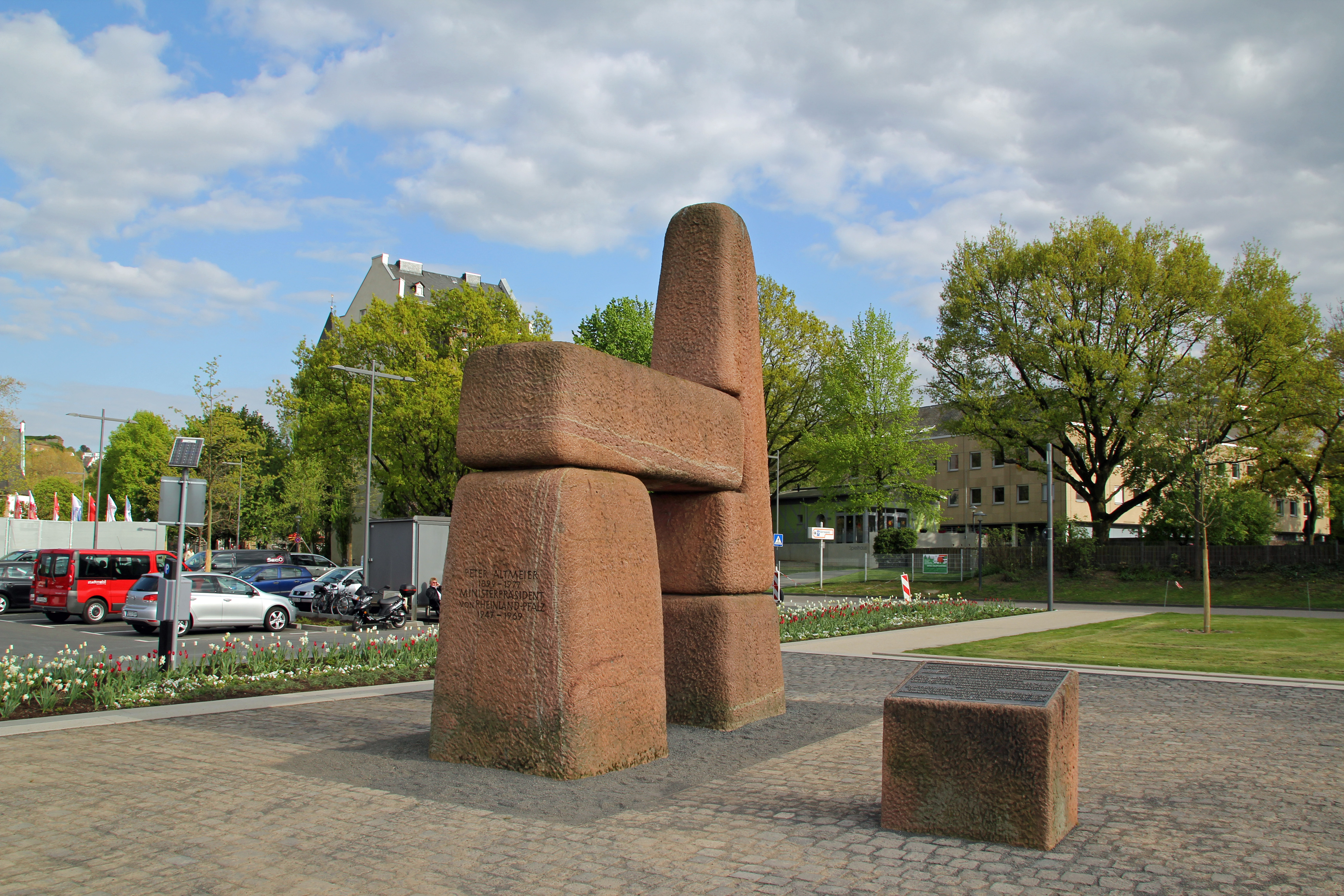
The Peter Altmeier Monument in Koblenz

=== Ashkenazi ShUM UNESCO ===
The region wholly includes the UNESCO heritage ShUM Jewish foundation cities, that will later become the origin of Ashkenazi Culture, as settled Jews made the linguistic switch to Germanic Yiddish. It later undergone major demographic changes.

=== 30 August 1946 ===
The state of Rhineland-Palatinate was founded shortly after the Second World War, on 30 August 1946. It was formed mainly from the southern part of the Prussian Rhine Province (the Regierungsbezirke of Koblenz and Trier), from Rhenish Hesse, from the western part of Nassau and the Bavarian Rhenish Palatinate minus the county of Saarpfalz. The Joint German-Luxembourg Sovereign Region (Gemeinschaftliches deutsch-luxemburgisches Hoheitsgebiet) is the only unincorporated area of the state of Rhineland-Palatinate. This condominium is formed by the rivers Moselle, Sauer, and Our, where they run along the border between Luxembourg and Rhineland-Palatinate or the Saarland. The region has a vast history, from the control of the Franks, to the control of the Holy Roman Empire, and saw fighting during the First and Second World Wars.

=== Emergence ===
The present state of Rhineland-Palatinate formed part of the French Zone of Occupation (1945–1949) after the Second World War. It comprised the former Bavarian Palatinate, the Regierungsbezirke ("government districts") of Koblenz and Trier (which formed the southern part of the Prussian Rhine Province), the parts of the Province of Rhenish Hesse (Rheinhessen) west of the River Rhine and belonged to the People's State of Hesse (Volksstaat Hessen), parts of the Prussian province of Hesse-Nassau (Montabaur), and the former Oldenburg region around Birkenfeld (Principality of Birkenfeld).

On 10 July 1945, the occupation authority on the soil of the present-day Rhineland-Palatinate transferred from the Americans to the French. To begin with, the French divided the region provisionally into two "upper presidiums" (Oberpräsidien), Rhineland-Hesse-Nassau (for the hitherto Prussian government districts and regions of Koblenz, Trier, and Montabaur) and Hesse-Palatinate (for the hitherto Bavarian Palatinate and old Hessian-Darmstadt province of Rhenish Hesse). The formation of the state was ordained on 30 August 1946, the last state in the Western Zone of Occupation to be established, by Regulation No. 57 of the French military government under General Marie-Pierre Kœnig. It was initially called Rhenish-Palatinate (Rheinpfälzisches Land or Land Rheinpfalz); the name Rhineland-Palatinate (Rheinland-Pfalz) was first confirmed in the constitution of 18 May 1947.

The provisional French government at that time wanted originally to leave the option open of annexing further areas west of the Rhine after the Saarland was turned into a protectorate. When the Americans and British, however had led the way with the establishment of German states, the French came under increasing pressure and eventually followed their example by setting up the states of Baden, Württemberg-Hohenzollern, and Rhineland-Palatinate. However the French military government forbade the Saarland from joining Rhineland-Palatinate. Mainz was named as the state capital in the regulation; the "Mixed Commission" (Gemischte Kommission), named as the highest organ of state charged with the administration of the new state and with the preparation of an advisory state assembly, started its work in Mainz. However war damage and destruction meant that Mainz did not have enough administrative buildings, so the headquarters of the state government and parliament were provisionally established in Koblenz. On 22 November 1946, the constituent meeting of the Advisory State Assembly (Beratende Landesversammlung) took place there, and a draft constitution was drawn up. Previously, local elections had been held. Wilhelm Boden was (after a short term of office as the Oberregierungspräsident of Rhineland-Hesse-Nassau) nominated on 2 December as the minister president of the new state by the French military government.

=== Early years ===
Adolf Süsterhenn submitted to the Advisory State Assembly a draft constitution, which was passed after several rounds of negotiation on 25 April 1947 in a final vote, with the absolute majority of the CDU voting for and the SPD and KPD voting against. A point of contention involved the draft constitution providing for separate schools based on Christian denomination. On 18 May 1947, 53% of the electorate adopted the Constitution for Rhineland-Palatinate in a referendum. While the Catholic north and west of the new state adopted the constitution by a majority, the majority in Rhenish Hesse and the Palatinate voted against it. On the same date the first elections took place for the state parliament, the Landtag of Rhineland-Palatinate. The inaugural assembly of parliament took place on 4 June 1947 in the large city hall at Koblenz. Wilhelm Boden was elected the first minister-president of Rhineland-Palatinate. Just one month later, Peter Altmeier succeeded him.

The constitutional bodies – the Government (Landesregierung), the Parliament (Landtag) and the Constitutional Court (Verfassungsgerichtshof) – established their provisional seat in Koblenz. In the following period, Koblenz and Mainz each emphasized their suitability as the state capital in a public debate. From the beginning, Minister-President Altmeier pressed for Mainz as the capital because he knew that the south of the country, especially the Palatinate, would not accept Koblenz, which was far to the north and formerly Prussian. On 16 May 1950, the Landtag decided to relocate itself and the Landesregierung from Koblenz to Mainz.

After the government and parliament moved to Mainz, many state authorities and courts remained in Koblenz, including the Constitutional Court and the State Archives. In addition, the German Federal Archives and Federal Office of Hydrology were established in Koblenz in 1952.

=== Consolidation ===
A sense of community developed only very gradually in the "land of the retort", which had been established largely without regard to the historical affiliations of its inhabitants. It was given little chance of survival, especially as it had very few large industrial centres. However, the establishment of numerous military bases, both Allied and Bundeswehr, helped to some extent to boost the economy. In 1956, under Article 29 of the Basic Law for the Federal Republic of Germany, petitions were made in the regions of Koblenz, Trier, Montabaur, Rhenish Hesse, and Palatinate for their separation from the state and incorporation into the respective states of North Rhine-Westphalia, Hesse, Bavaria, and Baden-Württemberg. All petitions for a referendum except those in the administrative district of Palatinate won the necessary majority; however, almost 20 years passed before the referendums finally took place. On 19 January 1975, none of the regions concerned returned a majority for being transferred to another state. This put an end to decades of discussion. Only the "AKK conflict", a dispute over the districts of Mainz-Amöneburg, Mainz-Kastel, and Mainz-Kostheim, has continued to exercise politicians up to the present day.

== Geography ==
Rhineland-Palatinate shares international borders with France (Grand Est), Luxembourg (Clervaux, Diekirch, Echternach, Grevenmacher, Remich, and Vianden), and Belgium (Wallonia). Within Germany, its neighbors are Baden-Württemberg, Hesse, North Rhine-Westphalia, and the Saarland. It is the ninth-largest state by area. Rhineland-Palatinate is part of the SaarLorLux euregion.

With 42% of its area covered by forests, it is the most forested state along with Hesse. The state's major rivers are the Rhine, including the UNESCO World Heritage Site Middle Rhine, and the Moselle. Several crater lakes of volcanic origin are in the Eifel, the largest of which is the Laacher See.

Climatically, Rhineland-Palatinate can be divided into two areas: The Rhenish Massif with a typically humid continental climate (Dfb). Summers here are usually warm with much precipitation and winters tend to be dry and cold. Snowfall is a common occasion.

The deep valleys of Rhine and Moselle with an oceanic climate (Köppen climate classification: Cfb). Summers are hot and moist, while winters are cool. Freezing temperatures are rare and snow usually melts within hours. The mild climate allows palm trees, fig trees, stone pines, oleander shrubs, olive trees, almond trees and other exotic plants to be grown in this area.

The forests in this region are home to common pests such as Melolontha hippocastani, that cause damage to the foliage and soil.

The Rhenish Massif forms roughly the northern half of the state, including the regions Eifel, Moselle Valley, Hunsrück, Westerwald, and parts of the Taunus. The Palatinate forms the biggest part of the southern half along with Rhenish Hesse. The Nahe Valley separates both parts.

== Administrative divisions ==
Districts and district-free cities of Rhineland-Palatinate

Rhineland-Palatinate is divided into 24 districts (Landkreise), 12 independent cities (Kreisfreie Städte).

=== Districts ===
Listing with Vehicle registration plates of Germany:

1. Ahrweiler (AW)
2. Altenkirchen (Westerwald) (AK)
3. Alzey-Worms (AZ)
4. Bad Dürkheim (DÜW)
5. Bad Kreuznach (KH)
6. Bernkastel-Wittlich (WIL, BKS)
7. Birkenfeld (BIR)
8. Cochem-Zell (COC, ZEL)
9. Donnersbergkreis (KIB, ROK)
10. Eifelkreis Bitburg-Prüm (BIT, PRÜ)
11. Germersheim (GER)
12. Kaiserslautern (KL)
13. Kusel (KUS)
14. Mainz-Bingen (MZ, BIN)
15. Mayen-Koblenz (MYK, MY)
16. Neuwied (NR)
17. Rhein-Hunsrück-Kreis (SIM, GOA)
18. Rhein-Lahn-Kreis (EMS, DIZ, GOH)
19. Rhein-Pfalz-Kreis (RP)
20. Südliche Weinstraße (SÜW)
21. Südwestpfalz (PS, ZW)
22. Trier-Saarburg (TR, SAB)
23. Vulkaneifel (DAU)
24. Westerwaldkreis (WW)

=== Independent cities ===
Listing with Vehicle registration plates of Germany:

1. Frankenthal (Pfalz) (FT)
2. Kaiserslautern (KL)
3. Koblenz (KO)
4. Landau in der Pfalz (LD)
5. Ludwigshafen am Rhein (LU)
6. Mainz (MZ)
7. Neustadt an der Weinstraße (NW)
8. Pirmasens (PS)
9. Speyer (SP)
10. Trier (TR)
11. Worms (WO)
12. Zweibrücken (ZW)

== Demographics ==
Historical population
Year	Pop.	±% p.a.
1815	1,202,412	—
1835	1,614,684	+1.48%
1871	1,832,388	+0.35%
1905	2,434,505	+0.84%
1939	2,959,994	+0.58%
1950	3,004,784	+0.14%
1961	3,417,116	+1.18%
1970	3,645,437	+0.72%
1975	3,665,777	+0.11%
1980	3,642,482	−0.13%
1985	3,615,049	−0.15%
1990	3,763,510	+0.81%
1995	3,977,919	+1.11%
2001	4,049,066	+0.30%
2011	3,989,808	−0.15%
2022	4,094,169	+0.24%

Selected foreign resident populations
Nationality	Population (31 December 2022)	Population (31 December 2023)
Turkey	59,630	61,880
Romania	48,795	51,530
Ukraine	52,460	51,300
Syria	46,425	49,800
Poland	44,635	44,715
Italy	32,480	31,125
Bulgaria	28,310	28,975
Afghanistan	18,680	20,645
Kosovo	14,530	15,665
Croatia	16,600	15,645
Luxembourg	12,195	11,815

=== Largest cities ===
The following table shows the ten largest cities of Rhineland-Palatinate:

Pos.	Name	Pop. 2024	Area (km^{2})	Pop. per km^{2}
1	Mainz	224,684	98	2,293
2	Ludwigshafen am Rhein	177,222	77	2,301
3	Koblenz	113,378	105	1,080
4	Trier	104,342	117	892
5	Kaiserslautern	100,426	140	717
6	Worms	86,753	109	796
7	Bad Kreuznach	54,168	56	967
8	Neuwied	67.083	87	771
9	Neustadt an der Weinstraße	52,945	117	453
10	Speyer	49,564	43	1,153

=== Vital statistics ===
- Births from January–August 2016 = ▲24,871
- Births from January–August 2017 = ▼24,784
- Deaths from January–August 2016 = ▼30,572
- Deaths from January–August 2017 = ▲32,167
- Natural growth from January–August 2016 = ▲ -5,701
- Natural growth from January–August 2017 = ▼ -7,383

=== Religion ===
Religion in Rhineland-Palatinate – 2025
Religion	Percent
None or other	44.6%
Roman Catholics	33.1%
EKD Protestants	22.3%

In 2025, 33.1 of the population of the state adhered to the Roman Catholic Church and 22.3% to the Protestant Church in Germany. 44.6% of the population was irreligious or adheres to other religions.

Muslims made up 5.0% of the population.

==== Jewish culture ====
The league of ShUM-cities in the later Rhineland-Palatinate comprised the Jewish communities of Mainz, Speyer, and Worms, which became the center of Jewish life during medieval times. The Takkanot Shum (Hebrew: תקנות שו"ם), or Enactments of ShU"M were a set of decrees formulated and agreed upon over a period of decades by their Jewish community leaders. Today, there are approximately 20,000 Jews (0.5% of the population) living in the state.

== Economy ==
The gross domestic product (GDP) of the state was 147.0 billion euros in 2018, accounting for 4.4% of German economic output. GDP per capita adjusted for purchasing power was 33,100 euros or 110% of the EU27 average in the same year. The GDP per employee was 102% of the EU average.

=== Industry ===
Rhineland-Palatinate leads all German states with an export rate around 50%. Important sectors are the winegrowing, chemical, pharmaceutical, and auto parts industries. "Distinctive regional industries" includes gemstones, ceramics and glass, and leather. Small and medium enterprises are considered the "backbone" of the economy in Rhineland-Palatinate. The principal employer is the chemical and plastics processing industry, which is represented by BASF in Ludwigshafen. Boehringer, BioNTech, Joh. A. Benckiser, SGE Deutsche Holding, and Schott Glassworks conclude the top five companies in the state.

=== Agriculture and viticulture ===
Rhineland-Palatinate is Germany's leading producer of wine in terms of grape cultivation and wine export. Its capital, Mainz, may be called the capital of the German wine industry, being the home of the German Wine Institute, the German Wine Fund in the Haus des Deutschen Weines (House of German Wine), and the Verband Deutscher Prädikatsweingüter (VDP) Wine Bourse, which brings together the top winemakers of Germany and the wine merchants of the world.

Of 13 wine regions producing quality wine in Germany, six (Rheinhessen, Pfalz, Mosel, Nahe, Mittelrhein, and Ahr) are located in Rhineland-Palatinate, with 65 to 70% of the production of wine grapes in Germany having their origin within the state. About 13,000 wine producers generate 80 to 90% of the German wine export. The total estimated production from the six Rhineland-Palatinate regions was nearly 7 million hectoliters in 2018.

Traditional grape varieties and a wide range of varieties developed during the last 125 years are characteristic for the region.

Classical white varieties are cultivated at 63,683 hectares (157,360 acres). These comprise the famous Rieslings 14,446 hectares (35,700 acres), Müller-Thurgau (8,663 hectares (21,410 acres)), Silvaner (3,701 hectares (9,150 acres)), and Kerner (3,399 hectares (8,400 acres)).

The share of red varieties grew constantly during the last decades and amounts to 20,000 hectares (49,000 acres). Dornfelder, a recent cultivar, is the leading red grape cultivated on 7,626 hectares (18,840 acres), which is more than a third. Blauer Portugieser (4,446 hectares (10,990 acres)) and Spätburgunder (3,867 hectares (9,560 acres)) show also appreciable cultivated shares.

In addition, Pinot blanc, Pinot gris, Chardonnay as white varieties and Regent and St. Laurent as red varieties have been increasing their share, as the growing conditions improve in Rhineland-Palatinate.

The state supports the wine industry by providing a comprehensive consultancy and education program in the service supply centers (German: DLR) of the land. The Geilweilerhof Institute for Grape Breeding is fully financed by the state. Many well-known new varieties such as Morio-Muskat, Bacchus, Optima, and Regent have been created in these institutes.

The worldwide leader in sparkling wine production, producing 224.4 million bottles in 2017/18, is the renowned Schloss Wachenheim Group. This company is headquartered in Trier, with operations in several locations in Rhineland-Palatinate and three sites in France (Compagnie Française des Grands Vins (CFGV)).

Other renowned sparkling wine producers such as Kupferberg, Deinhard, and Henkell also had their roots in the region, but now belong to companies outside the state as a result of business consolidation.

=== Electricity supply ===
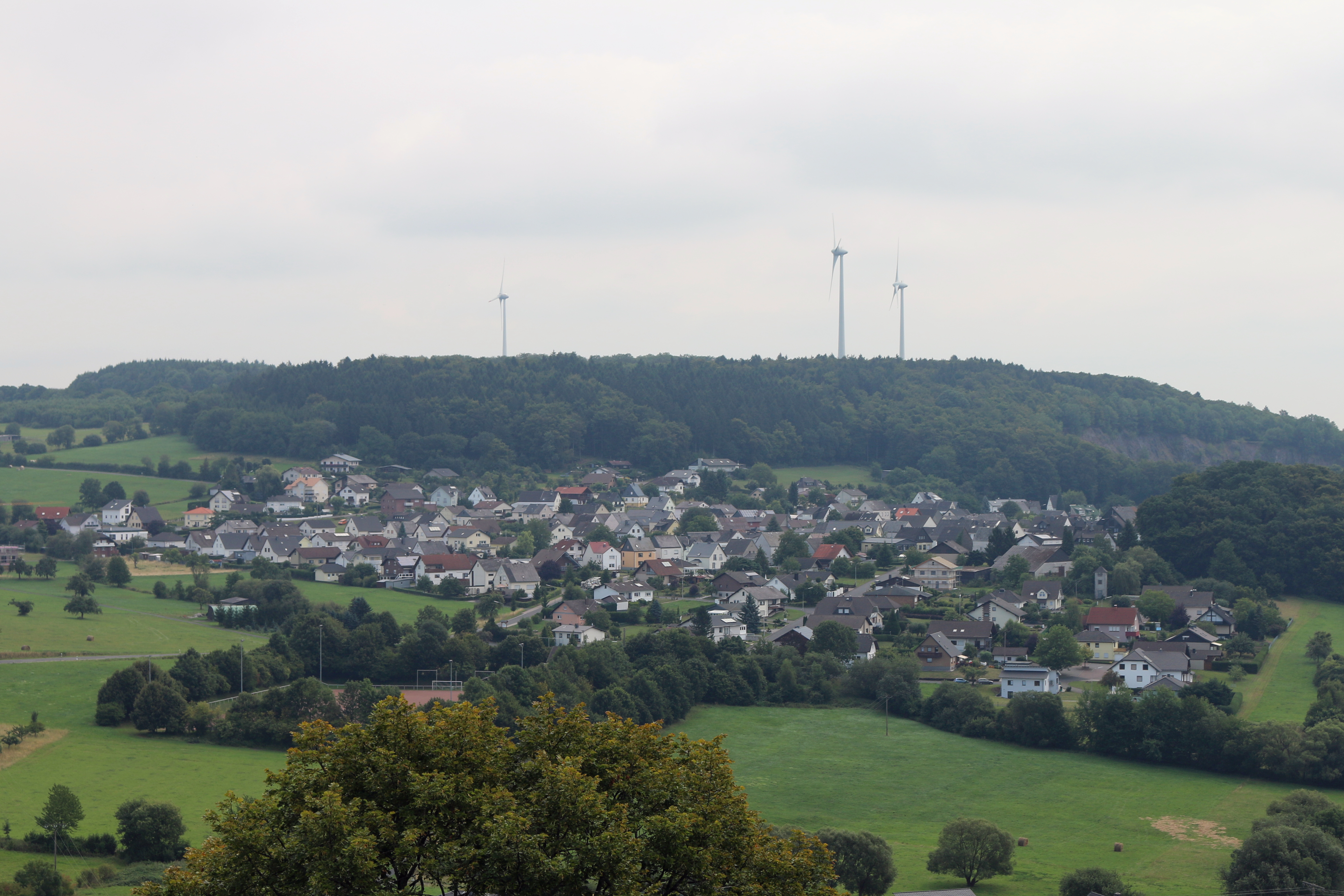
Wind park Girkenroth near Westerburg

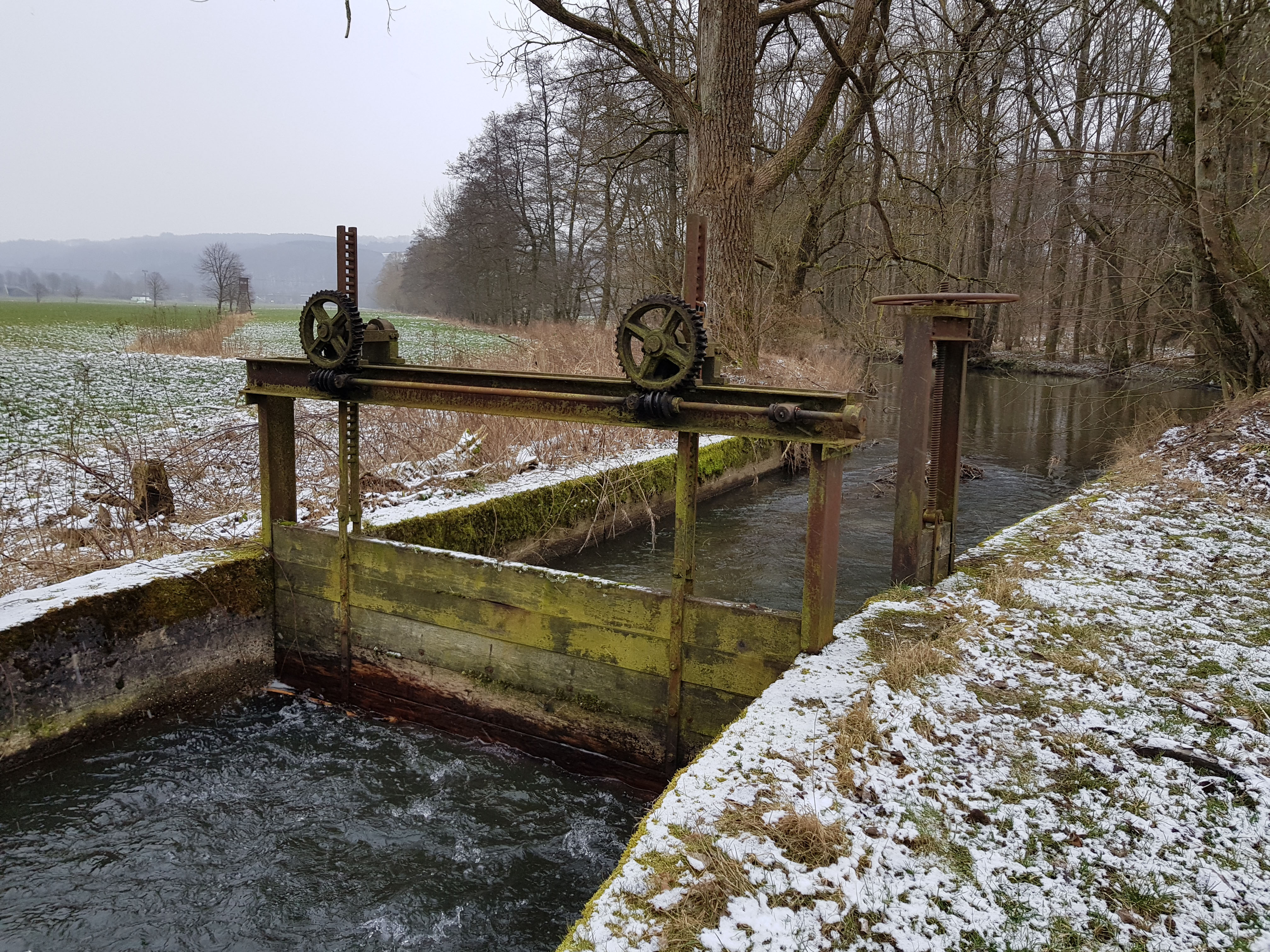
Hydropower at the Marienstatt Abbey of the Cistercians in Streithausen near Hachenburg

In 2026, the state locates 1,788 wind turbines that peoduce about 4.4 GW electrocity.

Also other sustainable sources of electric power are present like hydropower.

=== Unemployment ===
The unemployment rate stood at 4.4% in October 2018 and was lower than the German average.

Year	2000	2001	2002	2003	2004	2005	2006	2007	2008	2009	2010	2011	2012	2013	2014	2015	2016	2017	2018
Unemployment rate in %	7.3	6.8	7.2	7.7	7.7	8.8	8.0	6.5	5.6	6.1	5.7	5.3	5.3	5.5	5.4	5.2	5.1	4.8	4.4

== Transport ==
=== Rail ===
Access to long distance trains is available in Koblenz, Mainz, Ludwigshafen, Boppard, Andernach, Remagen, Montabaur and Kiaserslautern.

Several local trains (RB and RE) also serve the state.

The four transport associations located in the state are:

- Rhein-Nahe-Nahverkehrsverbund (RNN)
- Verkehrsverbund Rhein-Mosel (VRM)
- Verkehrsverbund Region Trier (VRT)
- Verkehrsverbund Rhein-Neckar (VRN)

Transport/fare associations from other states also have transitional fare zones in Rhineland-Palatinate, these are:

- Rhein-Main-Verkehrsverbund (RMV)
- Verkehrsverbund Rhein-Sieg (VRS)
- Westfalen-Tarif
- Karlsruher Verkehrsverbund (KVV)

=== Bus ===
Since Rhineland-Palatinate is a rural state, metros, Suburban trains, trams and lightrails are common, exception Mainz, a network of city and local busses exists, coachbusses like Flixbus serve Koblenz, Trier, Mainz, Ludwigshafen, Montabaur and Kiaserslautern.

=== Private motor vehicles ===
There'a large number of highways and motorways

=== Not motorized traffic ===
The state has a network of long distance walking paths and long distance walking- and cycling pathes, examples are:

- Rheinsteig (along the bank of Rhine in it's whole length)
- Moselsteig (along Moselle From Koblenz, Deutsches Eck to state border)
- Wiedweg, from Linden to Neustadt (Wied)
- Westerwaldsteig (from Herborn to Bad Hönningen
- Marienweg (from Marienstatt Abbey to Marienthal (Westerwald)
- Natursteig Sieg (along Sieg from state border to Mudersbach

=== Air ===
The state is served by Hahn Airport located in Lautzenhausen, the airport provides flights to some European destinations which are operated by low cost airlines. Residents of the state normally use other airports such as Frankfurt Airport, Luxembourg Airport, Saarbrücken Airport, and Cologne Bonn Airport to fly to other domestic and international destinations.

== See also ==
- Butterpfad
- Erbeskopf
- Nürburgring
- University Medical Center of Johannes Gutenberg University Mainz
