= Canton of Vianden =

Canton of Vianden Kanton Veianen (Luxembourgish) Kanton Vianden (German)
- Canton
- Coat of arms

- Coordinates: 49°56′N 6°10′E
- Country: Luxembourg
- Legislative constituency: Nord
- Seat: Vianden
- Communes: Putscheid; Tandel; Vianden

Area
  - Total: 78.5 km^{2} (30.3 sq mi)
  - Rank: 12th
- Highest elevation: 542 m (1,778 ft)
- Lowest elevation: 190 m (620 ft)

Population (2021)
  - Total: 5,502
  - Rank: 12th
  - Density: 70.1/km^{2} (182/sq mi)
  - Rank: 10th

Vianden (Luxembourgish: Veianen) is one of the 12 cantons of Luxembourg. Located in the north of the country, it shares international border with Germany. Spread across an area of 78.5 km^{2} (30.3 sq mi), it is the smallest canton by land area. It had a population of 5,680 individuals in 2024, which also makes it the smallest canton by population in the country. It incorporates the communes of Putscheid and Tandel, and the town of Vianden.

== History ==
The canton was established by the official decree of 31 August 1795 by the Committee of Public Safety during the French Revolutionary period. It was one of the 37 cantons in the Département des Forêts, which were grouped into four arrondissements (districts). The decree of 6 March 1802 reduced the number of cantons to 28. In 1815, the Congress of Vienna re-organised he borders, following which Vianden was one of the re-organized 32 cantons. While there were further changes to the district over time, the canton remained unaffected. In January 2006, the former commune of Bastendorf was split from Diekirch canton and was merged with the former commune of Fouhren from Vianden canton to create the commune of Tandel. Therefore, Vianden canton gained an area of 24.44 km^{2} (9.44 sq mi) of land from Diekirch canton. In 2015, the districts were abolished, making the canton one of the first level administrative units in the country.

== Geography ==
Vianden is a canton in Luxembourg. It is one of the 12 cantons, which are first level subdivisions of the local administrative unit (LAU-1) in the European Union's Nomenclature of Territorial Units for Statistics for Eurostat purposes. It is spread across an area of 78.5 km^{2} (30.3 sq mi), and is the smallest canton by land area. Located in the north of the country, it shares international border with Rhineland-Palatinate in Germany, and the cantons of Clervaux and Diekirch. Its seat is the city of Vianden. Vianden canton incorporates the communes of Putscheid and Tandel, and the town of Vianden. There are several highlands in the canton, with the highest located at Ronnebësch at an altitude of 545 m (1,788 ft).

== Demographics ==
As of 2024, Vianden canton had a population of 5,680 individuals, making it the smallest canton by population in the country. The population included 2,780 males and 2,722 females. About 967 individuals (18%) were less than the age of 15 years.

Historical population

Year	Pop.	±% p.a.
1821	3,484	—
1851	4,404	+0.78%
1900	3,987	−0.20%
1910	3,853	−0.34%
1922	3,587	−0.59%
1935	3,573	−0.03%

Year	Pop.	±% p.a.
1947	3,127	−1.10%
1960	3,776	+1.46%
1970	3,301	−1.34%
1981	3,277	−0.07%
1990	3,302	+0.08%
2000	3,495	+0.57%

Year	Pop.	±% p.a.
2005	4,004	+2.76%
2010	4,362	+1.73%
2015	4,847	+2.13%
2020	5,510	+2.60%
2021	5,482	−0.51%
2024	5,680	+1.19%

Source: Statistics portal of Luxembourg
