= St. Martin (Kirchdorf an der Amper) =

Coordinates: 48.4575945°N 11.6515120°E

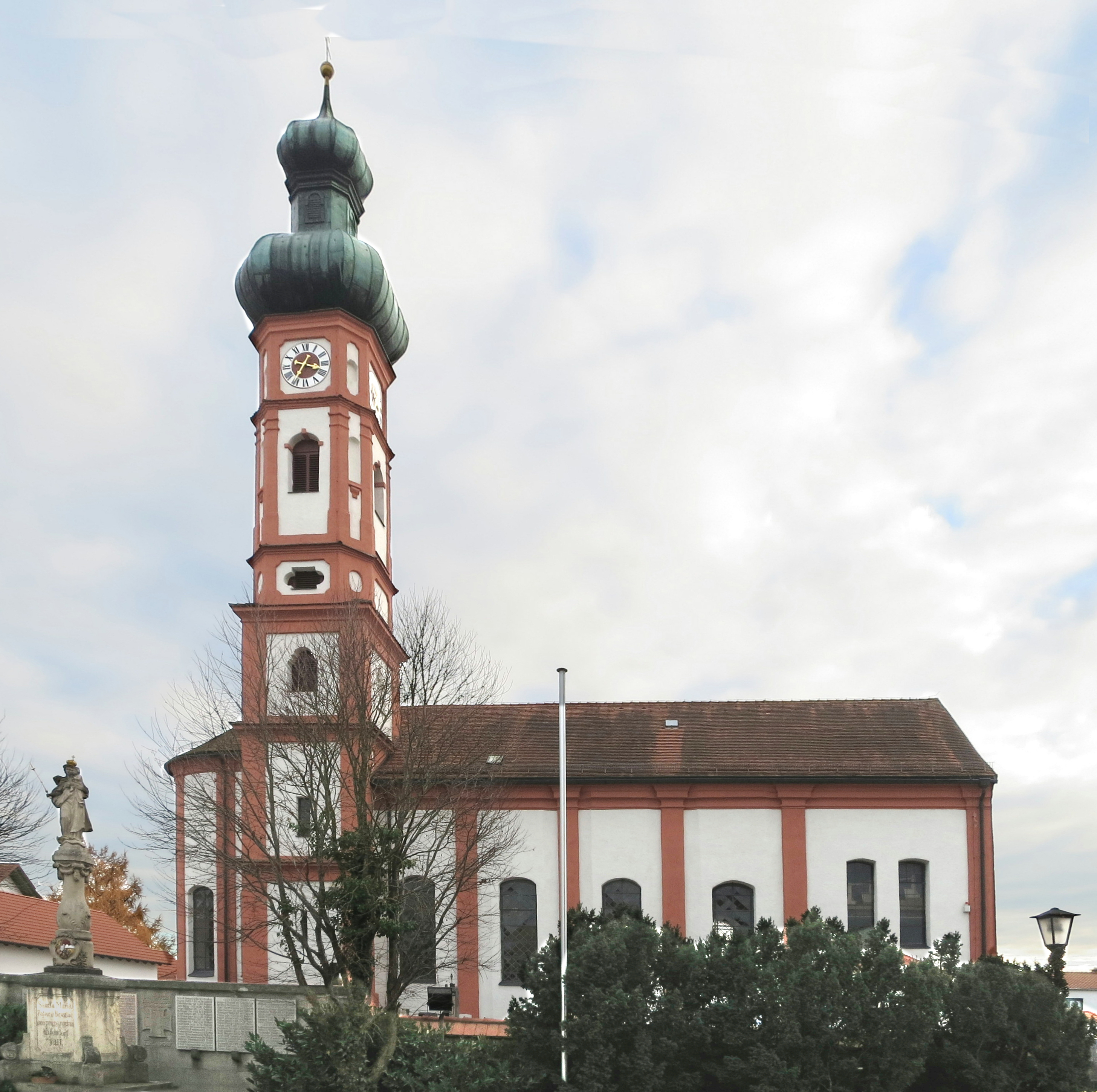
St. Martin in Kirchdorf an der Amper

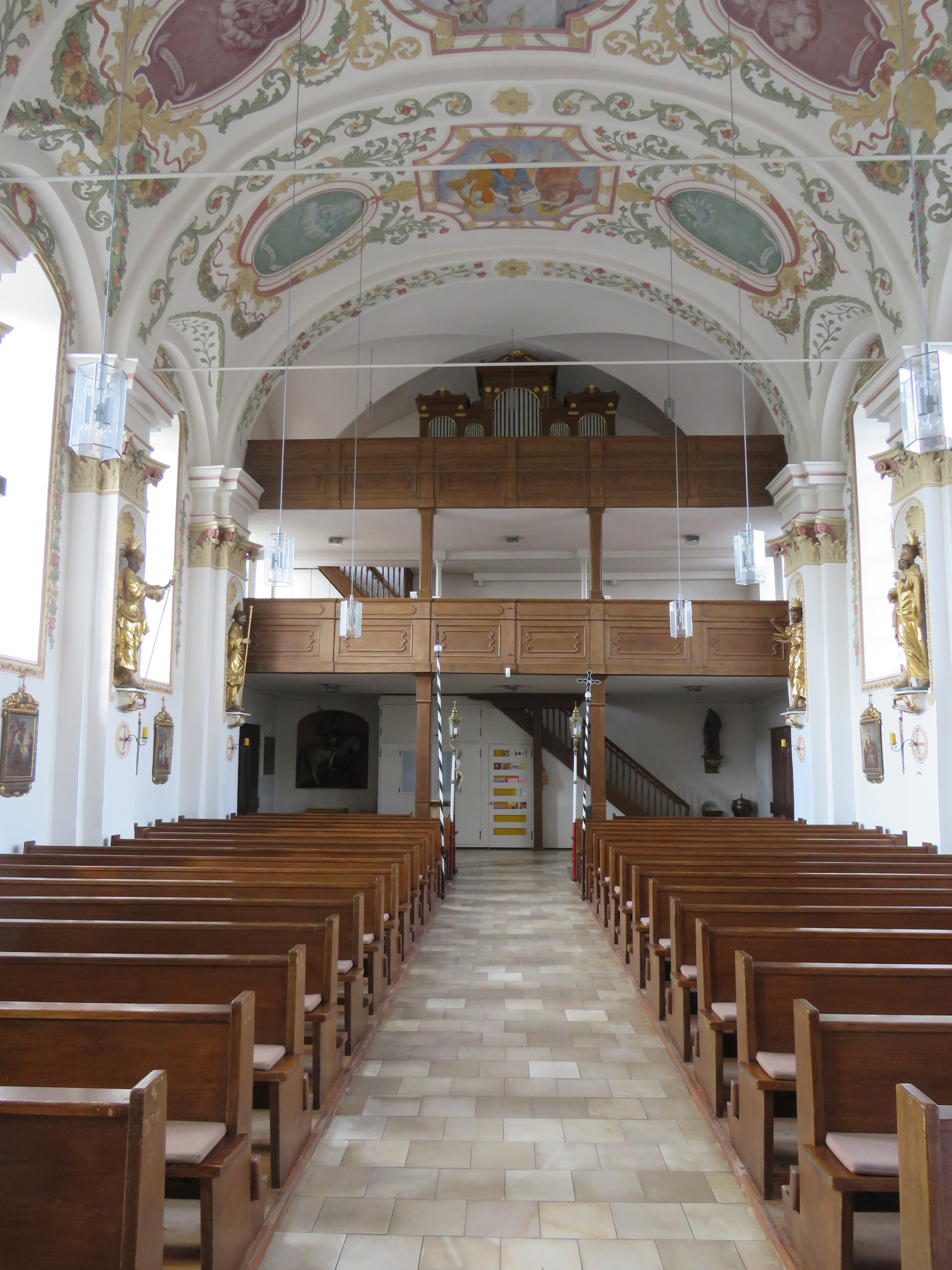
Interior view

St. Martin is a Roman Catholic parish church in Kirchdorf an der Amper, a municipality in Freising, Upper Bavaria. The church is a listed building (German: Kulturdenkmal) and is included in the list of architectural monuments maintained by the Bavarian State Office for Monument Protection under No. D-1-78-136-2. The parish belongs to the Roman Catholic Archdiocese of Munich and Freising.

== Description ==
The baroque wall pillar church was built between 1706 and 1708. It consists of a five bay nave, a semicircular choir apse on the east side, and a two-story sacristy on the south wall of the choir. The choir flanking tower with a Welscher dome on the north wall of the choir was only added between 1775 and 1779. The bell frames with four bells and the tower clock are built into its upper floors, which are divided by pilasters.

The interior is spanned by a barrel vault, which was decorated with neo-baroque ceiling paintings in 1921. The high altar, erected in 1783, features a depiction of Saint Martin of Tours flanked by sculptures of the archangels Michael and Raphael.

== Organ ==
The organ was built in 1886 as Opus 192 by Franz Borgias Maerz. It has 12 stops on two manuals and pedal. The disposition reads

I Manual (C–f^{3})		II Manual (C–f^{3})		Pedal (C–d^{1})	
Stop	Pitch Length	Stop	Pitch Length	Stop	Pitch Length
Bourdon	16′	Salicional	8′	Subbaß	16′
Principal	8′	Lieblich Gedeckt	8′	Octavbaß	8′
Tibia	8′	Fugara	4′	Violonbaß	8′
Gamba	8′				
Octav	4′				
Mixtur	2 2/3′				

- Coupling: II/I, I/P, II/P
- Guide: Tutti
- Note: Conical action, mechanical key and stop action, free-standing console

== Literature ==
- Georg Dehio, Handbuch der deutschen Kunstdenkmäler, Bayern IV, München und Oberbayern. Deutscher Kunstverlag. 2006. p. 578.
