= Andreas Allescher =

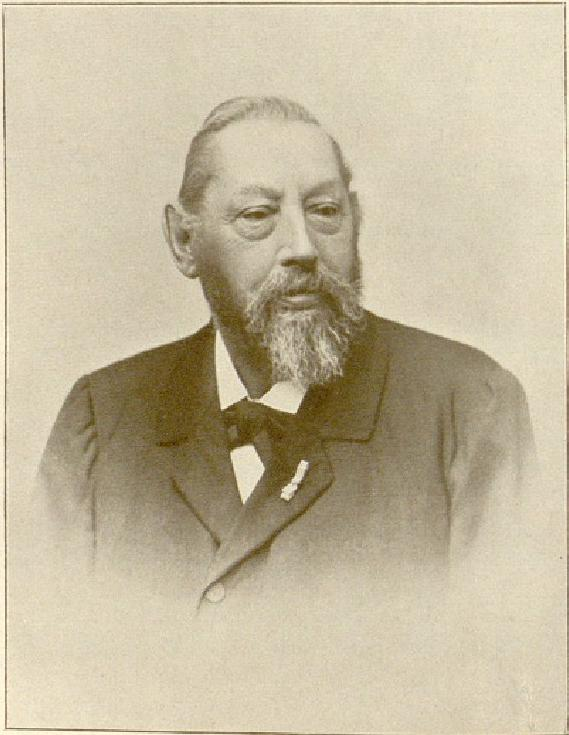
Andreas Allescher

Andreas Allescher (6 June 1828, in Munich – 10 April 1903, in Munich) was a German schoolteacher and mycologist.

Following training at the teachers' seminar in Freising, he spent several years teaching classes in Haag an der Amper, Munich and Engedey (near Berchtesgaden). In 1862 he returned to Munich, where he spent many years as a teacher at several facilities, including a post as an instructor at the district teachers' seminar (from 1872).

He made important contributions regarding fungi imperfecti to Rabenhorst's Kryptogamen-Flora series. Together with Johann Nepomuk Schnabl he edited the exsiccata series Fungi Bavarici (no. 1 - no. 700).

The mycological genera Allescheria (in Cenangiaceae family) in 1899, Allescheriella (in Botryobasidiaceae family) in 1897, and Allescherina (in Diatrypaceae family) in 1902, commemorate his name.

== Selected works ==
- Verzeichnis in Südbayern beobachteter Basidiomyceten, 1884 – Directory of southern Bavarian Basidiomycetes.
- Verzeichnis in Süd-Bayern beobachteter Pilze. Ein Beitrag zur Kenntnis der bayerischen Pilz-flora, (5 volumes, 1885–97) – Directory of southern Bavarian fungi.
- Die Pilze : Deutschlands, Oesterreichs und der Schweiz. Abtheilung 6. Fungi imperfecti : Hyalin-sporige Sphaerioideen, 1901 – Fungi: Germany, Austria and Switzerland. Division VI, Fungi imperfecti.
- Die Pilze : Deutschlands, Oesterreichs un der Schweiz / VII. Abtheilung, Fungi imperfecti: Gefarbt-sporige Sphaerioideen, sowie Nectrioideen, Leptostromaceen, Excipulaceen und Familien der Ordnung der Melanconieen, 1903 – Fungi: Germany, Austria and Switzerland. Division VII, Fungi imperfecti.
