= Johann Nepomuk Schnabl =

Johann Nepomuk Schnabl (5 October 1853 in Moosburg – 16 June 1899 in Munich) was a German schoolteacher and mycologist.

He worked as a schoolteacher in the communities of Zolling, Freising and Sendling (from 1877). In 1896 he was named head instructor at the "Höheren-Töchterschule" in Munich.

With mycologist Andreas Allescher, he edited the exsiccata Fungi Bavarici (no. 1 - no. 700). In 1892 he published Mykologische Beiträge zur Flora Bayerns (Mycological contribution to Bavarian flora").

He was the binomial authority of the fungi species Cryptomela allescheri, Curreya rehmii, Diplodia caraganae and Diplodia coluteae. Mycological taxa with the specific epithet of schnablianum commemorates his name; examples being Belonidium schnablianum (Rehm, 1896) and Fusarium schnablianum (Allesch., 1895).
