= Hollern =

Hollern may refer to the following places:

In Austria

- Hollern, part of Rohrau, Lower Austria

In Germany

- Hollern-Twielenfleth, a municipality in Lower Saxony
- Hollern, a part of Unterschleißheim, Bavaria
- Gut Hollern, a part of Eching, Bavaria

== See also ==
- Kate Hollern (born 1955), British Labour Party politician, Member of Parliament (MP) for Blackburn since 2015
