= Eching, Freising =

Place in Bavaria, Germany

Eching
- Municipality
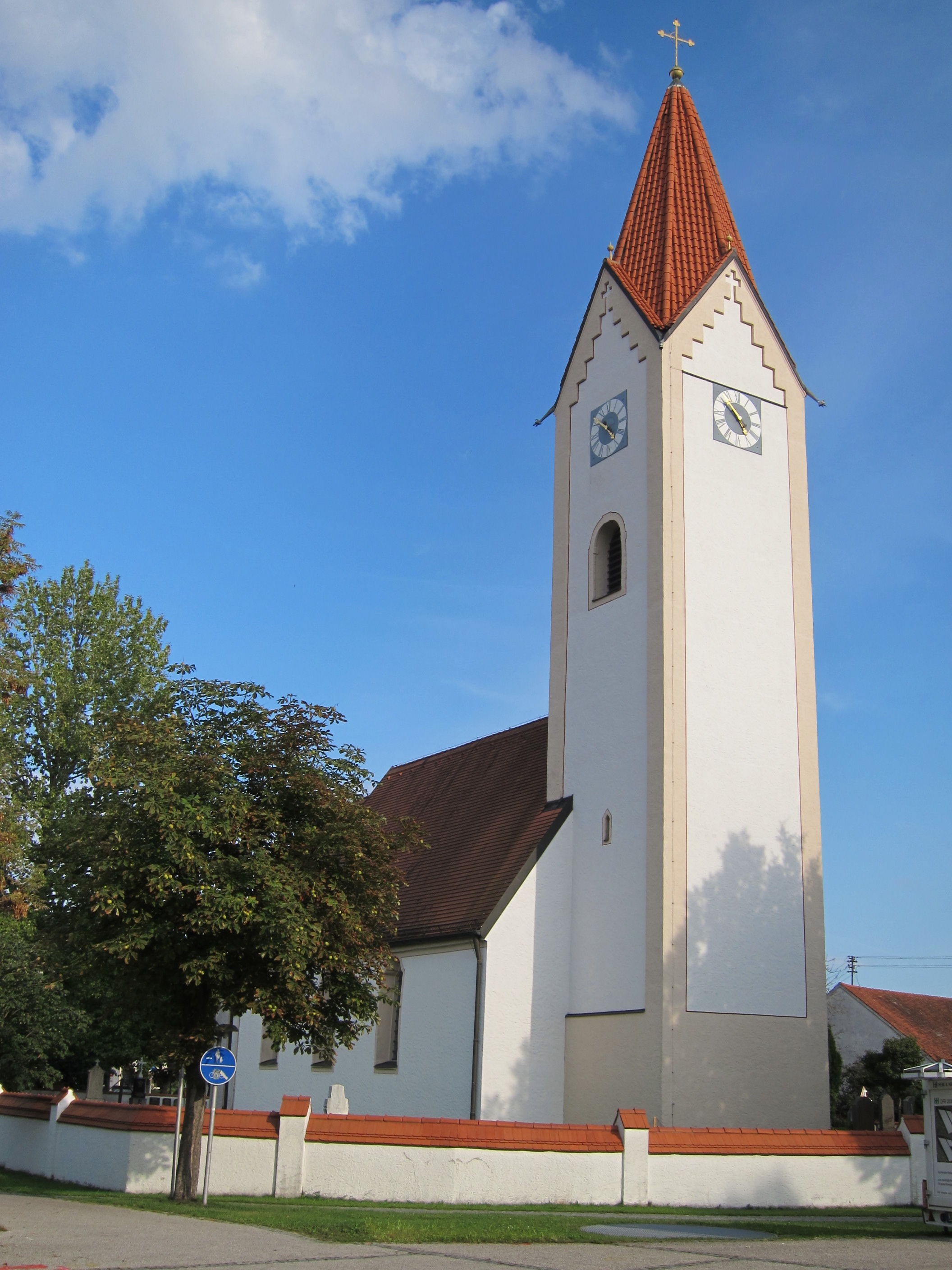
- Church of Saint Andrew

- Coat of arms

- Location of Eching within Freising district
- Interactive map of Eching
- Location within Germany Location within Bavaria
- Coordinates: 48°18′N 11°37′E
- Country: Germany
- State: Bavaria
- Admin. region: Oberbayern
- District: Freising
- Subdivisions: 7 Orte

Government
  - Mayor (2020–26): Sebastian Thaler (Ind.)

Area
  - Total: 37.32 km^{2} (14.41 sq mi)
- Elevation: 469 m (1,539 ft)

Population (2025-12-31)
  - Total: 14,732
  - Density: 394.7/km^{2} (1,022/sq mi)
- Time zone: UTC+01:00 (CET)
  - Summer (DST): UTC+02:00 (CEST)
- Postal codes: 85386, 85379
- Dialling codes: 089, 08165, 08133
- Vehicle registration: FS
- Website: www.eching.de

Eching (German pronunciation: [ˈɛçɪŋ]) is a municipality in the district of Freising, in Upper Bavaria, Germany.

== Geography ==
Eching is located 18 km north of Munich (centre) and 15 km southwest of Freising on the Munich gravel plain. The municipality is connected to the S-Bahn line 1 and the Autobahn A 9 and A 92.

=== Districts ===
The municipality Eching has existed since 1978 and consists of Eching, Eching-Ost, Günzenhausen, Ottenburg, Deutenhausen, Dietersheim and Hollern. The part of Hollern, west of the federal road B 13 has been incorporated with Unterschleißheim since 1990.

=== Neighboring municipalities ===
The municipality borders Neufahrn bei Freising in the northeast, Haimhausen and Fahrenzhausen in the northwest, Unterschleißheim in the west, Oberschleißheim in the southwest, Garching in the south and Hallbergmoos in the east.

== History ==
The first documented evidence of "Ehingas" appears in 773 in a deed of donation from Bishop Arbeo of Freising. Eching has belonged to the closed jurisdiction of Ottenburg for centuries. During an administrative reform in 1818 Eching Bavaria attained its autonomy as a municipality. With the building of the autobahn from 1936 to 1938 the area evolved from an agricultural into a more industrial structure. After the administrative reform of 1978 Günzenhausen, Ottenburg and Deutenhausen were brought into the municipality Eching. The establishment of the business park Eching, which was founded together with the neighboring municipality Neufahrn bei Freising and the link to the Munich International Airport via the Munich S-Bahn developed Eching into a modern suburban municipality.

== Coat of arms ==
The coat of arms of Eching shows the Freising blackamoor and heath blossoms flanking St. Andrew's Cross. The coat of arms has been used by Eching since 1967.

== Twin towns – sister cities ==
Eching is twinned with:

- Trezzano sul Naviglio, Italy (1972)
- Urubamba, Peru (1994)
- Majs, Hungary (2005)

== Culture and sights ==
The Community Center Eching is an important venue in Eching comprising a cabaret stage, an exhibition area and a restaurant.

The recreation area "Echinger See" (English: Eching Lake) is located to the south of Eching. The bathing season lasts from May 15 until September 15 of each year. The recreation area covers 33 hectares, of which 12.6 hectares is covered by the lake. The lake originated in the 1960s from a gravel quarry. Between Eching and Hollern are several other gravel quarry lakes for bathing, all which are planned to be developed into a recreational area close to town.

In the area of the municipality you can find several nature reserves: The Garchinger Heide, the Echinger Lohe created in 1951 and Mallertshofer Holz mit Heiden created in 1995.
