= Roman Catholic Deanery of Dachau =

The Roman Catholic Deanery of Dachau is a deanery of the Roman Catholic Church in the Archdiocese of Munich and Freising. The deanery encompasses an area approximately equal in size to the town of Dachau and the area of the municipalities Bergkirchen, Hebertshausen, Haimhausen, Fahrenzhausen, Röhrmoos and Schwabhausen. Currently, 18 parishes belong to the deanery, which is organized in five pastoral units. The dean of the deanery is Wolfgang Borm, a priest at St. Jakob.

== List of churches and parishes ==
Picture	Church	Location	Filialkirche	Pastoral unit
	Heilig Kreuz	Dachau-Ost		Pastoral unit Dachau-Hl. Kreuz - St. Peter
	St. Peter	Dachau-Augustenfeld		Pastoral unit Dachau-Hl. Kreuz - St. Peter
	St. Jakob	Dachau-Altstadt	St. Laurentius, Etzenhausen St. Stephan, Steinkirchen; St. Leonhard, Webling; St. Nikolaus, Goppertshofen; St. Kastulus, Prittlbach	Pastoral unit Dachau-St. Jakob
	Mariä Himmelfahrt	Dachau-Süd		Pastoral unit Dachau-St. Jakob
	St. Nikolaus	Mitterndorf	St. Vitus, Günding Unsere Liebe Frau Im Moos, Eschenried	Pastoral unit Dachau-St. Jakob
	St. Ursula	Pellheim	St. Johannes und Paulus, Arzbach St. Johannes, Oberweilbach; St. Martin, Unterbachern	Pastoral unit Dachau-St. Jakob
	St. Johann Baptist	Bergkirchen	St. Bartholomäus, Breitenau St. Nikolaus, Deutenhausen; St. Augustinus, Feldgeding; St. Jakob, Lauterbach; St. Jakob, Oberbachern; St. Urban, Palsweis	Pastoral unit Bergkirchen
	Heilig Kreuz	Kreuzholzhausen	Unsere Liebe Frau, Machtenstein	Pastoral unit Bergkirchen
	St. Peter und Paul	Oberroth		Pastoral unit Bergkirchen
	St. Michael	Schwabhausen	St. Kastulus, Puchschlagen St. Laurentius, Rumeltshausen	Pastoral unit Bergkirchen
	St. Peter	Ampermoching	Mariä Geburt, Unterweilbach St. Nikolaus, Sulzrain	Pastoral unit Röhrmoos-Hebertshausen
	St. Georg	Großinzemoos	St. Magarete, Kleininzemoos St. Vitalis, Sigmertshausen	Pastoral unit Röhrmoos-Hebertshausen
	Zum Allerh. Welterlöser	Hebertshausen	St. Georg, Hebertshausen	Pastoral unit Röhrmoos-Hebertshausen
	St. Johannes der Täufer	Röhrmoos	St. Lantpert, Riedenzhofen	Pastoral unit Röhrmoos-Hebertshausen
	St. Nikolaus	Haimhausen	St. Martin, Amperpettenbach St. Margareta, Großnöbach; Johannes Baptist, Hörenzhausen; Maria Himmelfahrt, Inhausen; St. Jakobus und St. Stephan, Ottershausen; Bründlkapelle	Pastoral unit Fahrenzhausen-Haimhausen
	Mariä Himmelfahrt	Jarzt-Fahrenzhausen	St. Vitus, Fahrenzhausen St. Silvester, Appercha; St. Stephanus, Lauterbach; St. Peter und Paul, Westerndorf; St. Anna, Unterbruck	Pastoral unit Fahrenzhausen-Haimhausen
	St. Georg	Weng	St. Leonhard, Großeisenbach	Pastoral unit Fahrenzhausen-Haimhausen
	St. Michael	Giebing	St. Johannes der Täufer, Kammerberg St. Laurentius, Viehberg	Pastoral unit Fahrenzhausen-Haimhausen

== Catholic organizations and groups in the deanery Perlach ==
=== Bund der Deutschen Katholischen Jugend ===
All Catholic youth organizations (KjG, KLJB and scouts) of the district Dachau form together the Bund der Deutschen Katholischen Jugend (BDKJ, English: "Association of the German Catholic Youth") of the district Dachau. The BDKJ Dachau represents the political, social and ecclesiastical interests of the Catholic youth in Dachau, which includes the church, society and the diocesan assembly of the BDKJ.

=== Deanery association ===
The katholische junge Gemeinde (kjg) Perlach is one of the major youth organizations that brings together the parish youths at deanery level. It organizes regular meetings and activities. It is part of the diocesan association of the Katholische Junge Gemeinde (KjG München und Freising).
