= Kammerberg (Fahrenzhausen) =

- Ortsteil of Fahrenzhausen
- Interactive map of Kammerberg
- Location within Germany Location within Bavaria
- Coordinates: 48°22′19″N 11°31′1″E
- Country: Germany
- State: Bavaria
- District: Freising
- Municipality: Fahrenzhausen
- Elevation: 480 m (1,570 ft)

Population (2011)
  - Total: 580
- Time zone: UTC+01:00 (CET)
  - Summer (DST): UTC+02:00 (CEST)
- Postal codes: 85777
- Dialling codes: 08137

Kammerberg is a village within the municipality of Fahrenzhausen in the district of Freising (Upper Bavaria), Germany.

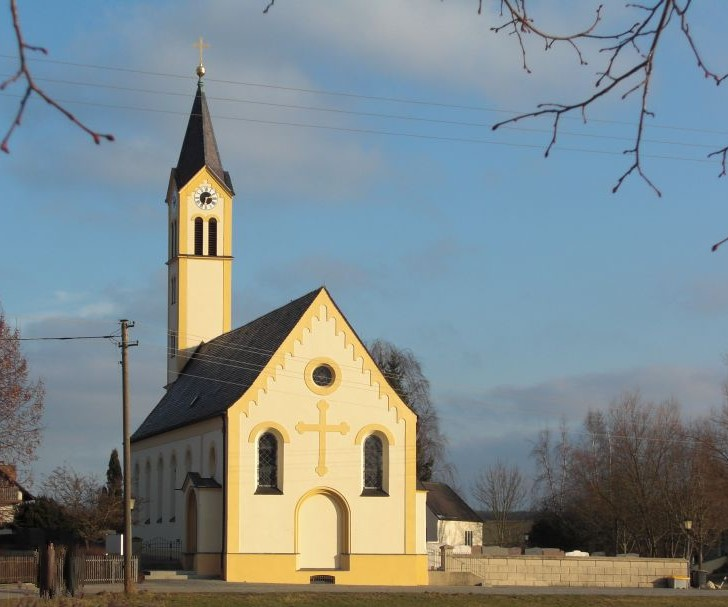
St. John the Baptist Church in Kammerberg

== Geography ==
Kammerberg is surrounded by the neighboring villages of Gramling, Giebing, Kollbach, Weißling, Lauterbach, Bachenhausen and Viehbach. The B13 runs about one kilometer east of Kammerberg. The Kammerberger Forest, locally called 'Hiakl', connects to the south. The Rettenbach creek flows west of Kammerberg. The area is surrounded by forests, streams and agricultural farmland.

== History ==
Kammerberg was first documented as "Perga" between 1006 and 1029. In 1315 this place was called "Chamerberch". The family members of the "Chammerberger" served the Bavarian dukes as ministerials from the 13th to the 15th century and were primarily active as judges and orderlies. Kammerberg was a Bavarian Hofmark that belonged to the district court of Kranzberg.

There are no detailed reports that Kammerberg was damaged or plundered during the Thirty-Years-War (1618-1648), even though other surrounding towns and villages have such information, (such as the nearby village of Giebing).

Kammerberg became an independent political municipality during the Administrative Reforms in Bavaria in 1818.

On 1 May 1978 the previously independent community was incorporated into the community of Fahrenzhausen.

=== Notable buildings and landmarks ===
==== St. John the Baptist Church ====
The local Catholic church was built in Kammerberg around 1315. The church was rebuilt in 1610 and again in 1890. There is a family crypt of the noble family of Kammerberg inside the church.

During World War II, the church bells were removed and melted down to make weapons. After the war, new church bells were installed in 1949.

==== Schloss Kammerberg ====
Kammerberg Castle/Manor House (built in the 17th / 18th centuries) was originally a four-wing complex and was redesigned several times. At one time it was surrounded by a moat with a lake in front of the main gate. The dried-out lake bed is still visible to this day. The Barons of Vequel-Westernach family have lived in the manor house since 1826.

==== Kindergarten ====
A 19th-century grade school was converted to a Kindergarten (Sunshine) in 1998.

==== Gasthof zur Post ====
Stately two-storey building with a crooked hip roof, most-likely built in the 16th/17th Century. It served as both a guest house and a royal post office station for centuries. Rebuilt around 1900.

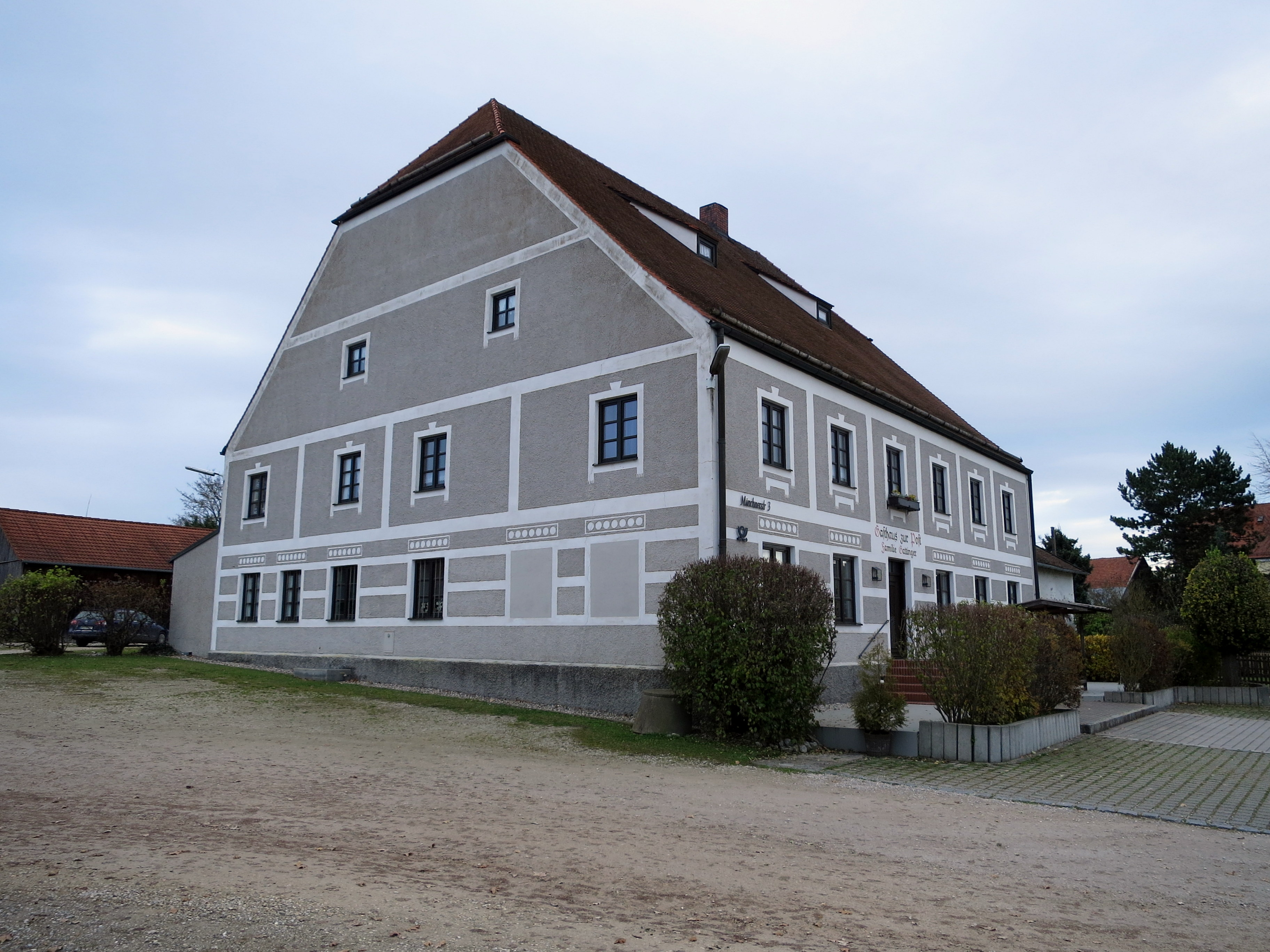
Gasthaus zur Post in Kammerberg

==== War Memorial ====
A statue of the Virgin Mary standing on a stone block was put up in the center of the town around 1920 as a war memorial. Inscribed on the stone block are the names of the men of Kammerberg who went off to fight in the First World War and never came home. The list of names were extended for the men of Kammerberg who fought and died in the Second World War.

=== Sport ===
Kammerberg has a sports club, Spiel-Vereinigung Kammerberg e.V.

=== Wind and solar energy park ===
Since 2015/2016 Kammerberg and the neighboring village of Lauterbach maintain a large Wind Turbine Tower (149 meters) as well as a large solar park. There are plans to build more Wind Generator Towers in the area.
