= Oberappersdorf =

- Ortsteil of Zolling
- Interactive map of Oberappersdorf
- Location within Germany Location within Bavaria
- Coordinates: 48°29′51″N 11°48′12″E
- Country: Germany
- State: Bavaria
- Admin. region: Oberbayern
- District: Freising
- Municipality: Zolling
- Elevation: 481 m (1,578 ft)

Population
  - Total: 554
- Time zone: UTC+01:00 (CET)
  - Summer (DST): UTC+02:00 (CEST)
- Postal codes: 85406
- Dialling codes: 08168

Oberappersdorf is a village in the municipality of Zolling, Bavaria, Germany. The St. George Church in Oberappersdorf is affiliated with churches St. Valentine (Gerlhausen) and Obermarchenbach. The town is located about 7 km north of Zolling, 15 km north of Freising and about 58 km northeast of Munich. Nearby towns include Attenkirchen, Moosburg, Nandlstadt and Au in Hallertau.

== History ==
The nearby place "Appersdorf" was first mentioned in 860. The town's name derives from "Village of the abbot" and probably refers to the old possession of the monastery Tegernsee in the area. In 1465, also the village "Nyder Appelstarff" was mentioned, which refers to the present hamlet Unterappersdorf. In the course of administrative reform in Bavaria, the community was created in 1818 as the independent municipality Oberappersdorf. In 1972, this community was incorporated into Zolling.
