= Rudelzhausen =

- Municipality
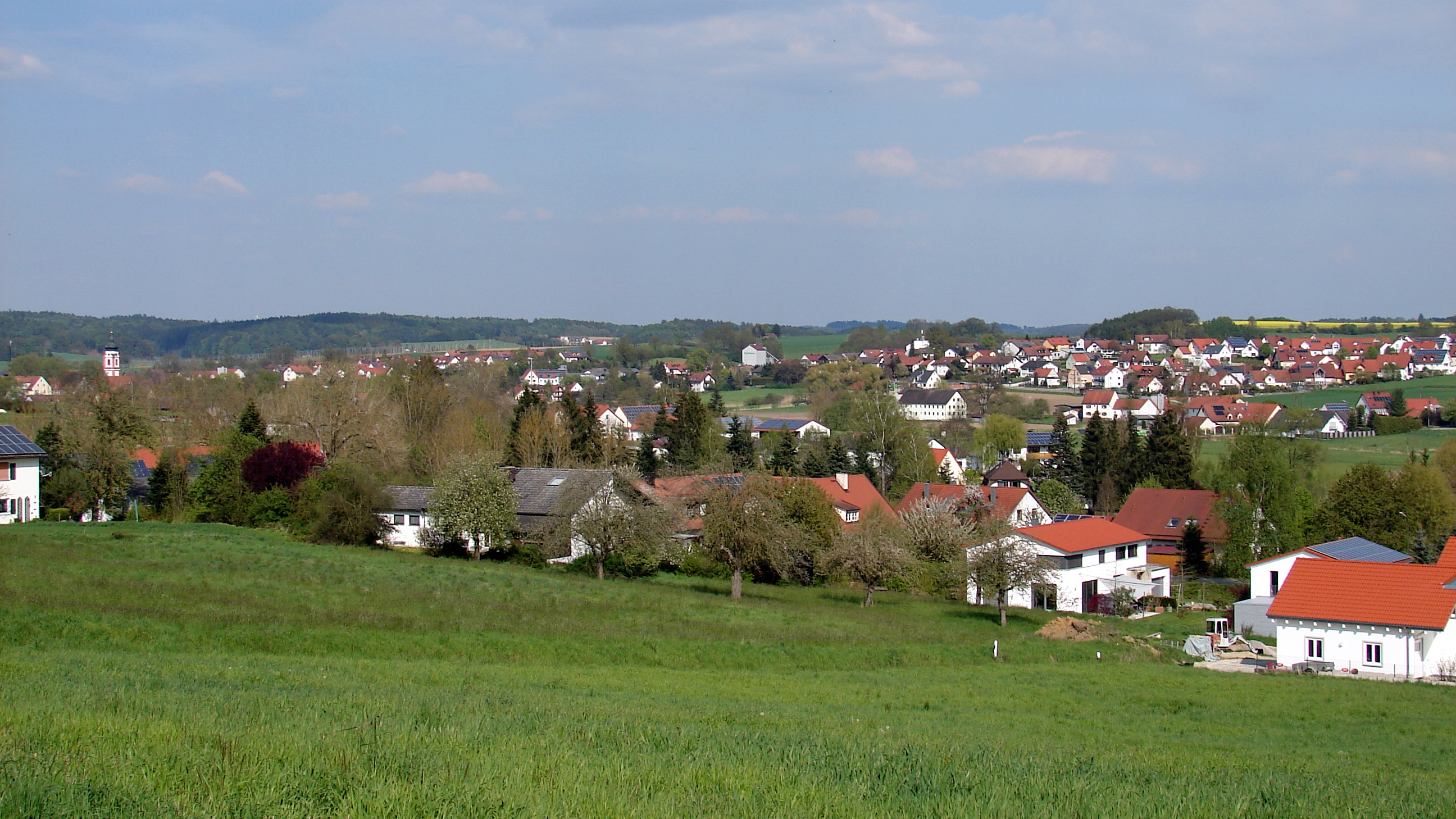
- General view of Rudelzhausen

- Coat of arms

- Location of Rudelzhausen within Freising district
- Interactive map of Rudelzhausen
- Location within Germany Location within Bavaria
- Coordinates: 48°35′N 11°46′E
- Country: Germany
- State: Bavaria
- Admin. region: Oberbayern
- District: Freising
- Subdivisions: 20 Ortsteile

Government
  - Mayor (2020–26): Michael Krumbucher (FW)

Area
  - Total: 40.8 km^{2} (15.8 sq mi)
- Elevation: 440 m (1,440 ft)

Population (2025-12-31)
  - Total: 3,510
  - Density: 86.0/km^{2} (223/sq mi)
- Time zone: UTC+01:00 (CET)
  - Summer (DST): UTC+02:00 (CEST)
- Postal codes: 84104
- Dialling codes: 08752
- Vehicle registration: FS
- Website: https://gemeinde-rudelzhausen.de/

Rudelzhausen (German pronunciation: [ʁuːdl̩tsˈhaʊzn̩]) is a municipality in the district of Freising in Bavaria in Germany.

== Population Trend ==
Year	Inhabitants
1970	2,315
1987	2,390
2000	3,015
