= Allershausen =

- Municipality
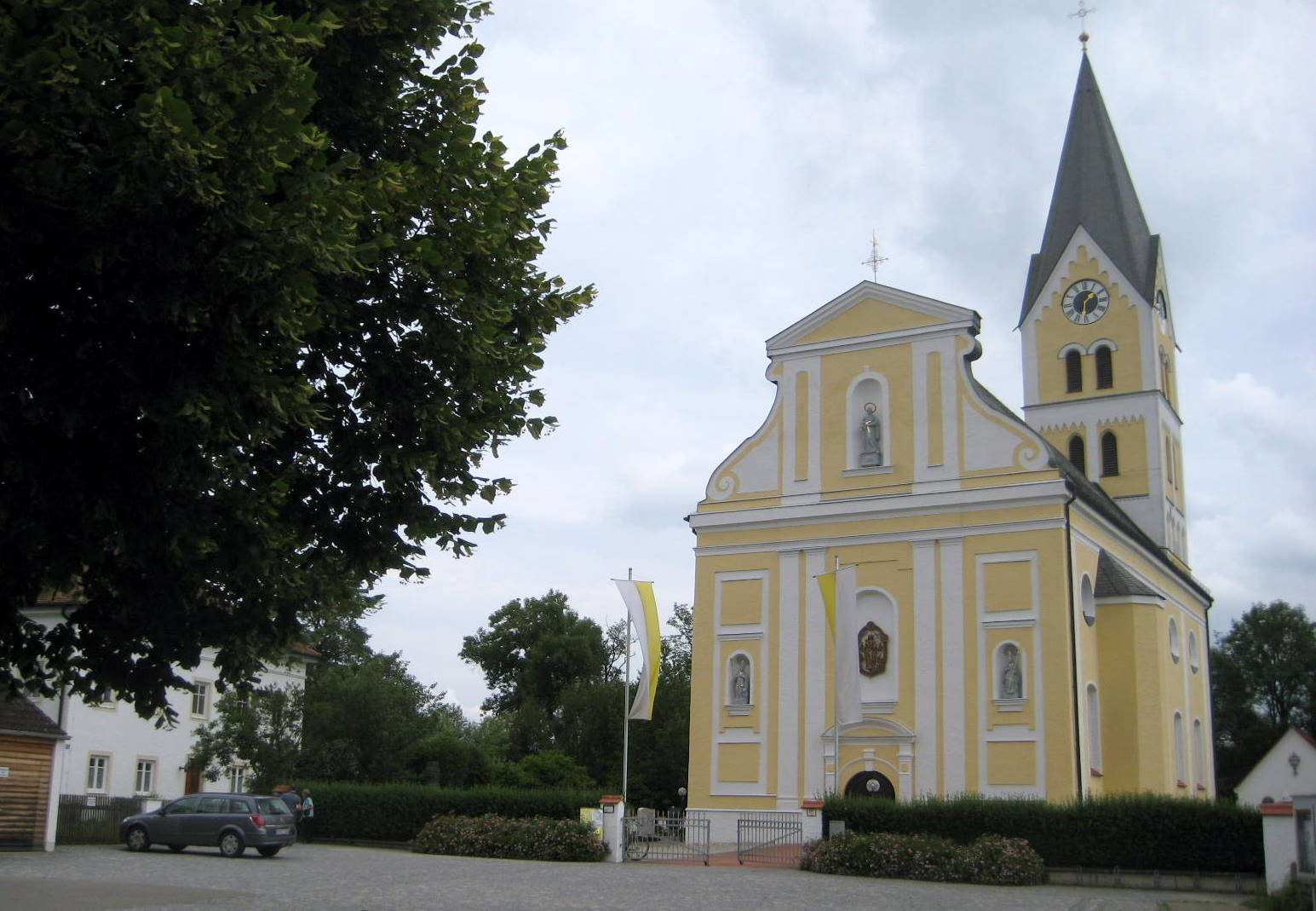
- Church in Allershausen

- Coat of arms

- Location of Allershausen within Freising district
- Interactive map of Allershausen
- Location within Germany Location within Bavaria
- Coordinates: 48°25′N 11°36′E
- Country: Germany
- State: Bavaria
- Admin. region: Oberbayern
- District: Freising
- Municipal assoc.: Allershausen
- Subdivisions: 14 Ortsteile

Government
  - Mayor (2020–26): Martin Vaas

Area
  - Total: 26.55 km^{2} (10.25 sq mi)
- Elevation: 442 m (1,450 ft)

Population (2025-12-31)
  - Total: 5,953
  - Density: 224.2/km^{2} (580.7/sq mi)
- Time zone: UTC+01:00 (CET)
  - Summer (DST): UTC+02:00 (CEST)
- Postal codes: 85391
- Dialling codes: 08166
- Vehicle registration: FS
- Website: www.allershausen.de

Allershausen (German pronunciation: [alɐsˈhaʊzn̩]) is a municipality in the district of Freising, in Upper Bavaria, Germany.
