= Viehbach (Fahrenzhausen) =

- Village of Fahrenzhausen
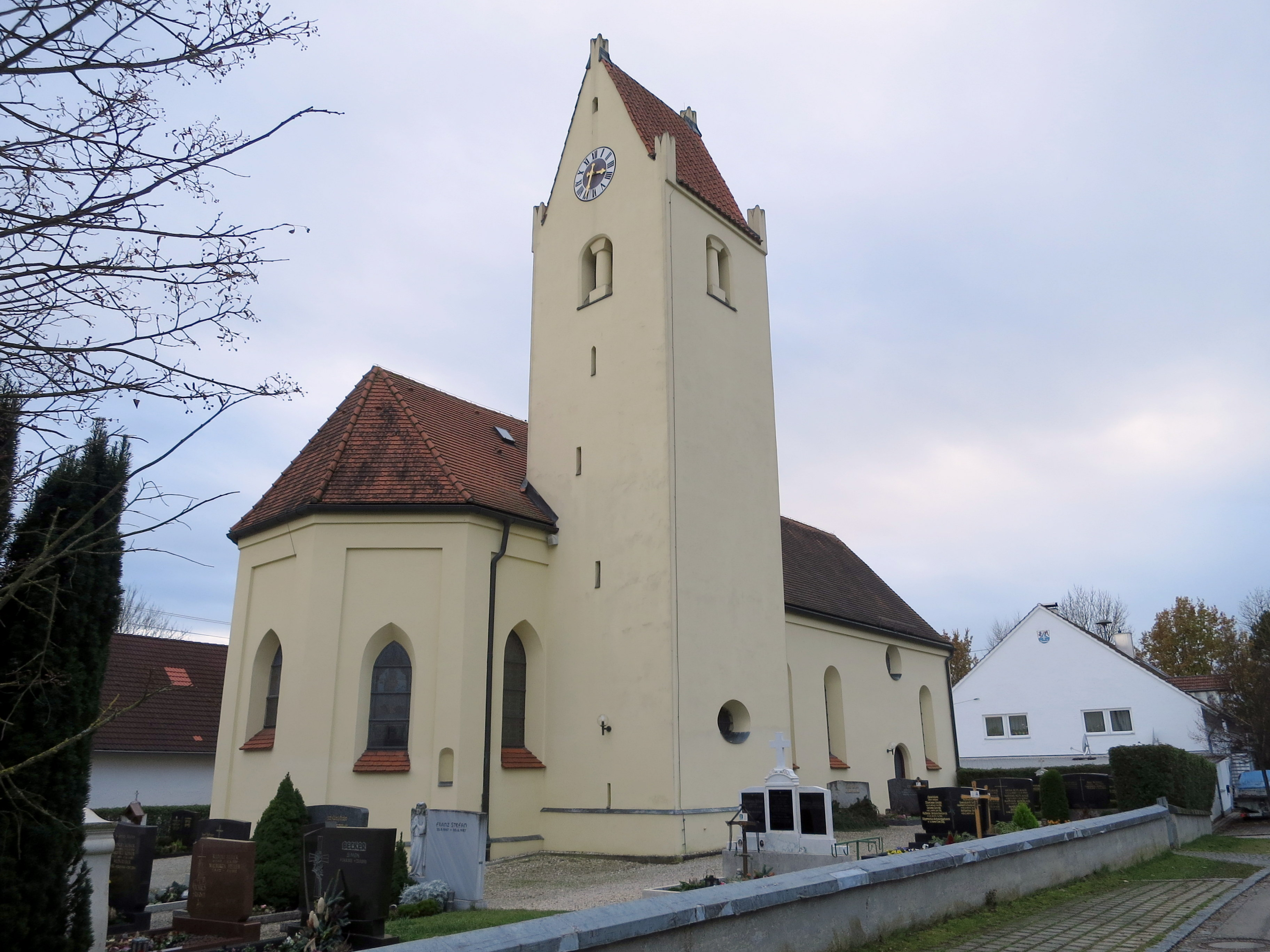
- St. Laurentius Church, Viehbach (2016)
- Interactive map of Viehbach
- Location within Germany Location within Bavaria
- Country: Germany
- State: Bavaria
- Municipality: Fahrenzhausen
- Elevation: 473 m (1,552 ft)
- Time zone: UTC+01:00 (CET)
  - Summer (DST): UTC+02:00 (CEST)
- Postal codes: 85777
- Dialling codes: 08133

Viehbach is a village in the municipality of Fahrenzhausen in the district of Freising in Upper Bavaria, Germany.

== History ==
The small village is first mentioned in church tax records during the time of bishop Otto von Freising (1138-1158) as "Viehpach" or "Fichten am Bach" (Lit: Spruce Trees on the Creek) when a certain "Gumpolt de Viechpach" and an "Ortolfus de Viechpach" are listed as witnesses to the legal transactions. The village was probably settled even earlier. An old Roman road from Passau to Augsburg passes between Viehbach and Westerndorf.

The name of the church in Viehbach (St. Laurentius) is first mentioned in a document in 1315. Local sources say that today's church was built on the foundations of a much earlier church. The village belonged to the district court of Kranzberg, while the church was under the control of the Diocese of Freising.

Viehbach appears in 1568 on a map by Philipp Apian during his Bavarian map project for Albrecht V. Duke of Bavaria.

Viehbach and its church were probably affected during the Thirty Years War, especially during the Swedish invasion of Bavaria in 1632, or even the French attack in the area in 1648. In 1669 new side altars were rebuilt in the church.

One of the earliest houses still standing in Viehbach is called the 'Brandweiner Hof', (built in late 17th century and began distilling Brandy in the early to late-18th century).The Nickname stayed with the house ever since.

Viehbach and other villages were in danger by the Duke of Marlborough during the War of the Spanish Succession in July 1704. After Marlborough's forces defeated the French at Schellenberg on the Danube, the English and Prussian forces began rampaging and burning villages south of the Danube (in areas between Augsburg and Dachau) until they regrouped on the Danube to fight the French again at Blenheim on August 13. The villages of Viehbach and Bachenhausen recorded the looting and fires, that was happening all around them. When their houses were miraculously saved from destruction, they vowed to hold a mass every year on St. Florian's Day (May 4) to commemorate their liberation. The Annunciation can still be seen today in the old village church in Viehbach.

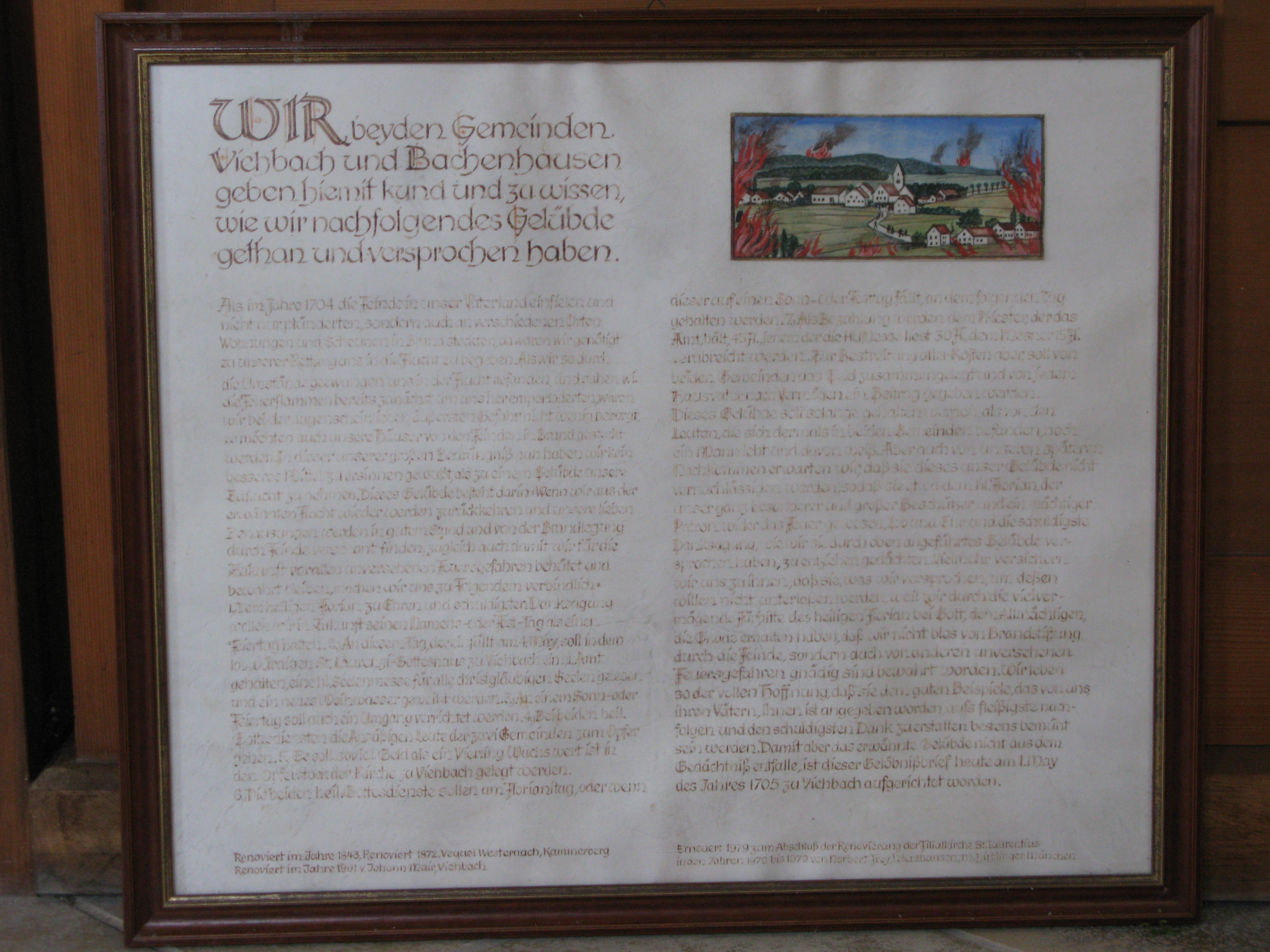
Vow of Thanksgiving in church in Viehbach

Viehbach has been part of the Fahrenzhausen community since the early 19th century. In 1817 the church recorded 118 believers in Viehbach, who lived in 26 houses. In 1868 a census by the Kingdom of Bavaria recorded 143 inhabitants and 55 buildings. In 1876 a census of the German Empire recorded 169 inhabitants and 56 buildings (including 43 horses and 180 cattle).

In 1926, several WWI veterans founded a shooting/marksmanship club in Viehbach, (using real ammunition). It closed during the WWII-Era but was restarted in 1950, (but only air pistols were allowed).

Near the end of the Second World War, units of the US Army passed through Viehbach and the surrounding area in April 1945 shortly before the liberation of Dachau and Munich.

Viehbach was part of a district reform program in the 1970s, in which the jurisdiction was transferred from Dachau to Freising.

In the late 1990s and early 2000s Viehbach was the location of several art exhibitions under the guidance of farmer and amateur artist/wood-carver Siegfried Stolz at the 'Brandweiner Hof'.

In 2009 a solar park was built south of Viehbach (approx. 8000 m^{2} field).

In 2014 the shooting club SG "Gemütlichkeit" Viehbach-Bachenhausen e.V. opened a new facility in Viehbach, (in a former air-conditioning workshop near the old church).

Since 2017, Viehbach has hosted a 'Knödelfest' (Dumpling Festival) where traditional dishes are served and donations are made to a local children's hospital.

In 2018 Viehbach had 465 inhabitants.

In 2020 proposals were made to build a Children's Play Area between Viehbach and Bachenhausen, along the Rettenbach Creek. The playground was completed in 2024. Although it was flooded in early June 2024.

In May 2026, the shooting club (SV-Gemütlichkeit) Viehbach-Bachenhausen celebrated the 100th jubilee.

== Bachenhausen ==
The village of Bachenhausen is just 1/2 Kilometer north of Viehbach, near the Rettenbach Creek. The village first appears in a church document as early as the 8th century. It is known for its tiny chapel on the road to Kammerberg, built in 1820.

== Prominent Persons associated with Viehbach ==
- Wolf Ackva (1911–2000), Actor, buried in Viehbach

== Literature ==
- Hans Schertl, "Kirchen und Kapellen im Dachauer Land (German)"
