= Attenkirchen =

- Municipality
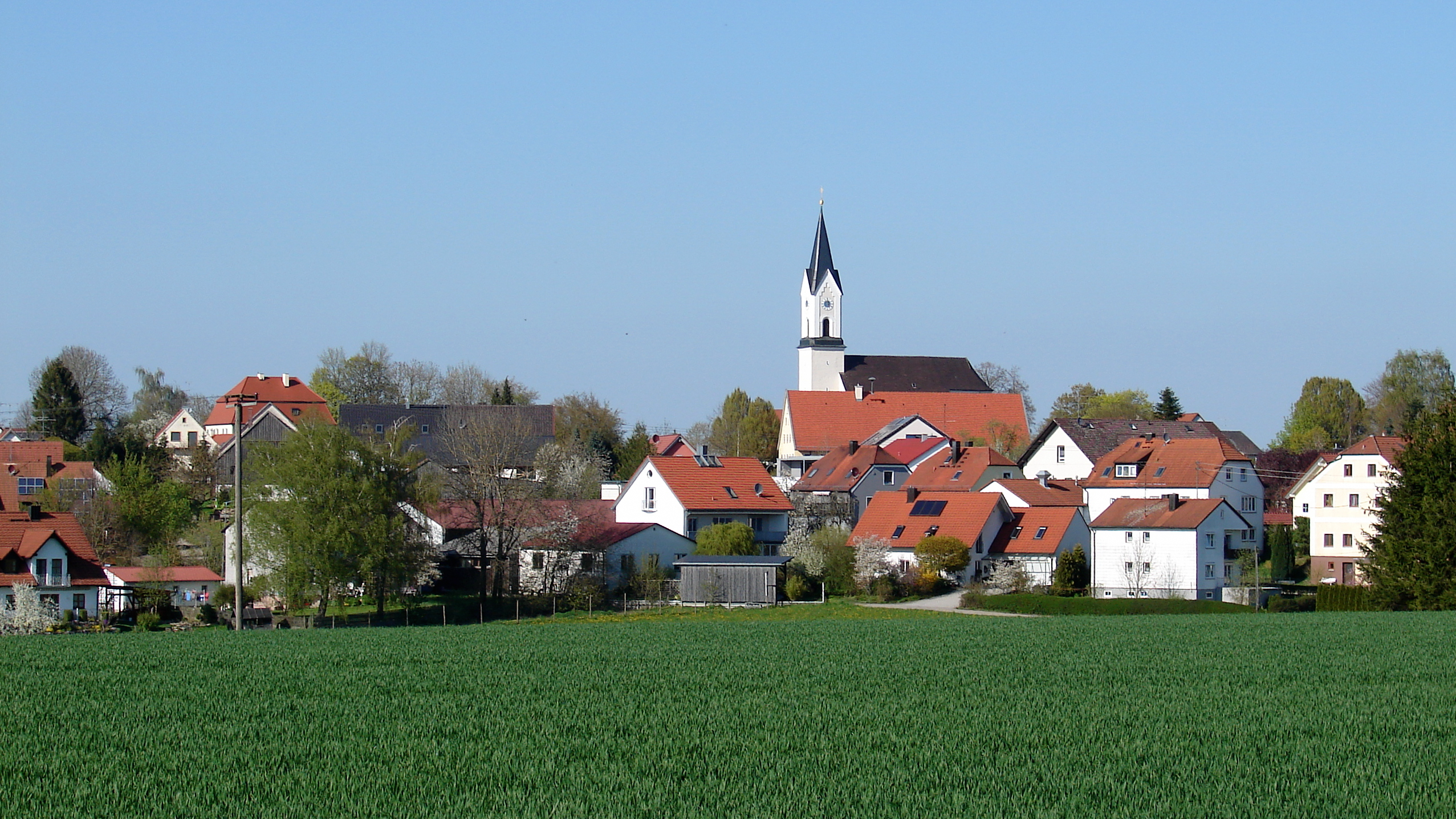
- Attenkirchen

- Coat of arms

- Location of Attenkirchen within Freising district
- Interactive map of Attenkirchen
- Location within Germany Location within Bavaria
- Coordinates: 48°30′N 11°46′E
- Country: Germany
- State: Bavaria
- Admin. region: Oberbayern
- District: Freising
- Municipal assoc.: Zolling

Government
  - Mayor (2020–26): Mathias Kern

Area
  - Total: 16.1 km^{2} (6.2 sq mi)
- Elevation: 524 m (1,719 ft)

Population (2025-12-31)
  - Total: 2,734
  - Density: 170/km^{2} (440/sq mi)
- Time zone: UTC+01:00 (CET)
  - Summer (DST): UTC+02:00 (CEST)
- Postal codes: 85395
- Dialling codes: 08168
- Vehicle registration: FS
- Website: www.attenkirchen.de

Attenkirchen (German pronunciation: [atn̩ˈkɪʁçn̩]) is a municipality in the district of Freising in Bavaria in Germany.
