= Kirchdorf an der Amper =

Kirchdorf a.d.Amper
- Municipality
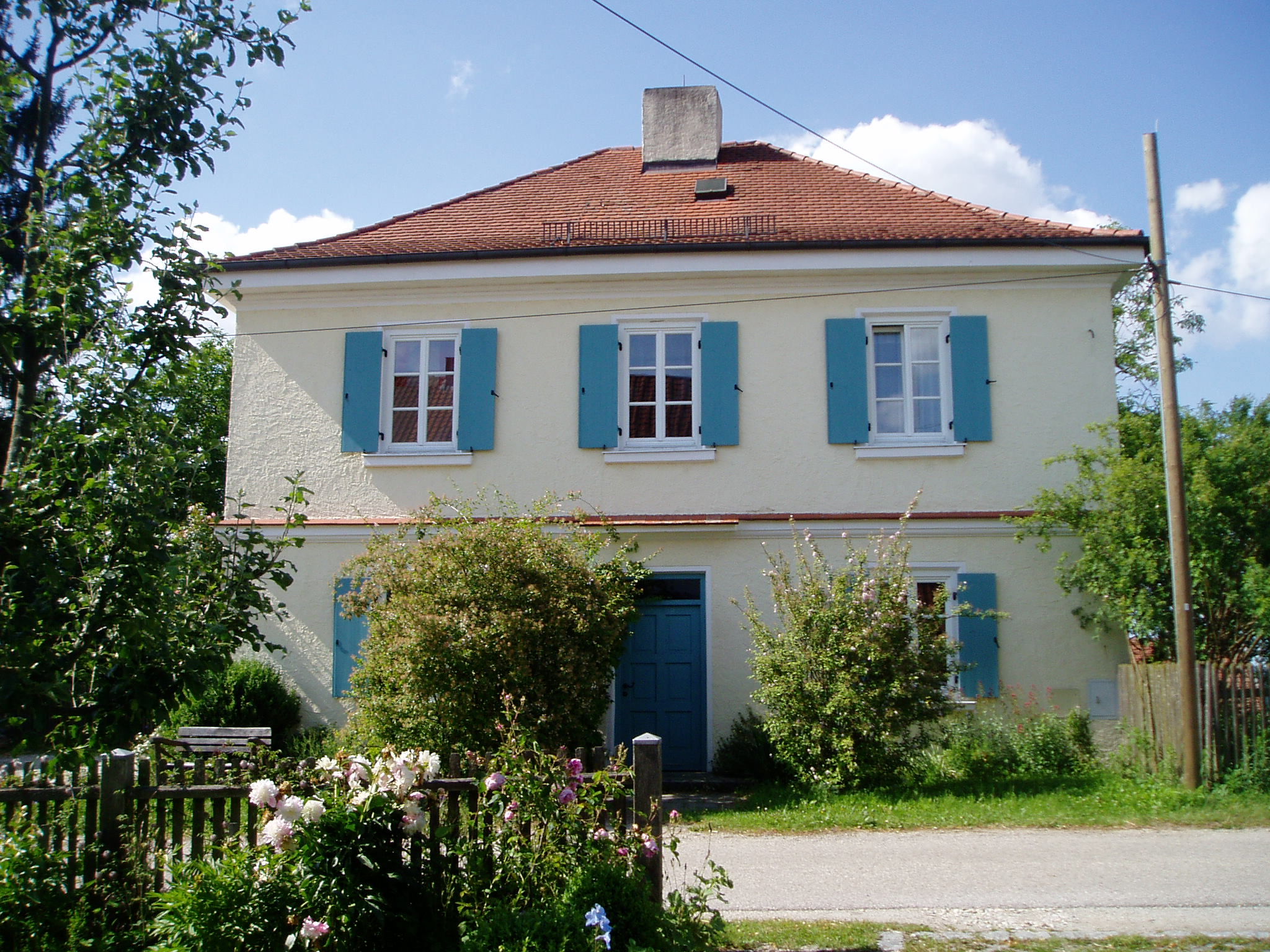
- Rectory

- Coat of arms

- Location of Kirchdorf a.d.Amper within Freising district
- Interactive map of Kirchdorf a.d.Amper
- Location within Germany Location within Bavaria
- Coordinates: 48°28′N 11°39′E
- Country: Germany
- State: Bavaria
- Admin. region: Oberbayern
- District: Freising

Government
  - Mayor (2020–26): Uwe Gerlsbeck

Area
  - Total: 32.97 km^{2} (12.73 sq mi)
- Elevation: 440 m (1,440 ft)

Population (2025-12-31)
  - Total: 3,393
  - Density: 102.9/km^{2} (266.5/sq mi)
- Time zone: UTC+01:00 (CET)
  - Summer (DST): UTC+02:00 (CEST)
- Postal codes: 85414
- Dialling codes: 08166
- Vehicle registration: FS
- Website: www.gemeinde-kirchdorf-amper.de

Kirchdorf an der Amper (German pronunciation: [ˈkɪʁçdɔʁf ʔan deːɐ̯ ˈʔampɐ], lit. 'Kirchdorf on the Amper'; official name: Kirchdorf a.d. Amper) is a municipality in the district of Freising in Bavaria, Germany, on the Amper River.

== History ==
=== Early History and Christianization ===
During Christianization, St. Martin's Church was built in Weihenstephan as a pastoral church for the inhabitants of the lower Ampertal valley. The settlement that developed around it was simply called Kirchdorf (church village).

The oldest settlement in the municipality, Nörting, was first mentioned in 788 under Freising bishop Atto von Freising (783–811), while the neighboring village of Helfenbrunn appeared in documents for the first time in 813.

=== Medieval Period ===
In 1123, Kirchdorf was first mentioned in a document in connection with a noble family of the same name, which died out in 1423. Kirchdorf was established as a pastoral center in the lower Amper Valley by Weihenstephan. The parish was incorporated into the Premonstratensian monastery of Neustift in Freising in 1358. The monastery became the most important landowner in the municipal area and had the Kirchdorf church rebuilt between 1706 and 1708. Kirchdorf was also an important place of pilgrimage for a time.

Until the end of the 18th century, Kirchdorf was part of the Länbach administrative district of the Sichendorf office (near Zolling) in the Moosburg district court. It became an independent political municipality in Bavaria in 1818 as part of the administrative reforms.

=== Modern Era ===
After the Second World War, the population of Kirchdorf grew rapidly due to the influx of displaced persons. On March 12, 1979, the name of the municipality was officially changed from “Kirchdorf” to “Kirchdorf an der Amper (Kirchdorf a.d. Amper).”

== Culture and sights ==
- Parish church of St. Martin in Kirchdorf, in front of which stands a Marian column commemorating those who fell in the Franco-Prussian War.
- St. George's branch church in Burghausen
- Chapel (Geierlambach)
- Chapel St. Sebald (Helfenbrunn)
- Branch church St. Pankratius in Hirschbach
- Branch church St. Katharina (Nörting)|St. Katharina in Nörting
- Branch church St. Nikolaus and school in Wippenhausen
