= Wolfersdorf =

- Municipality
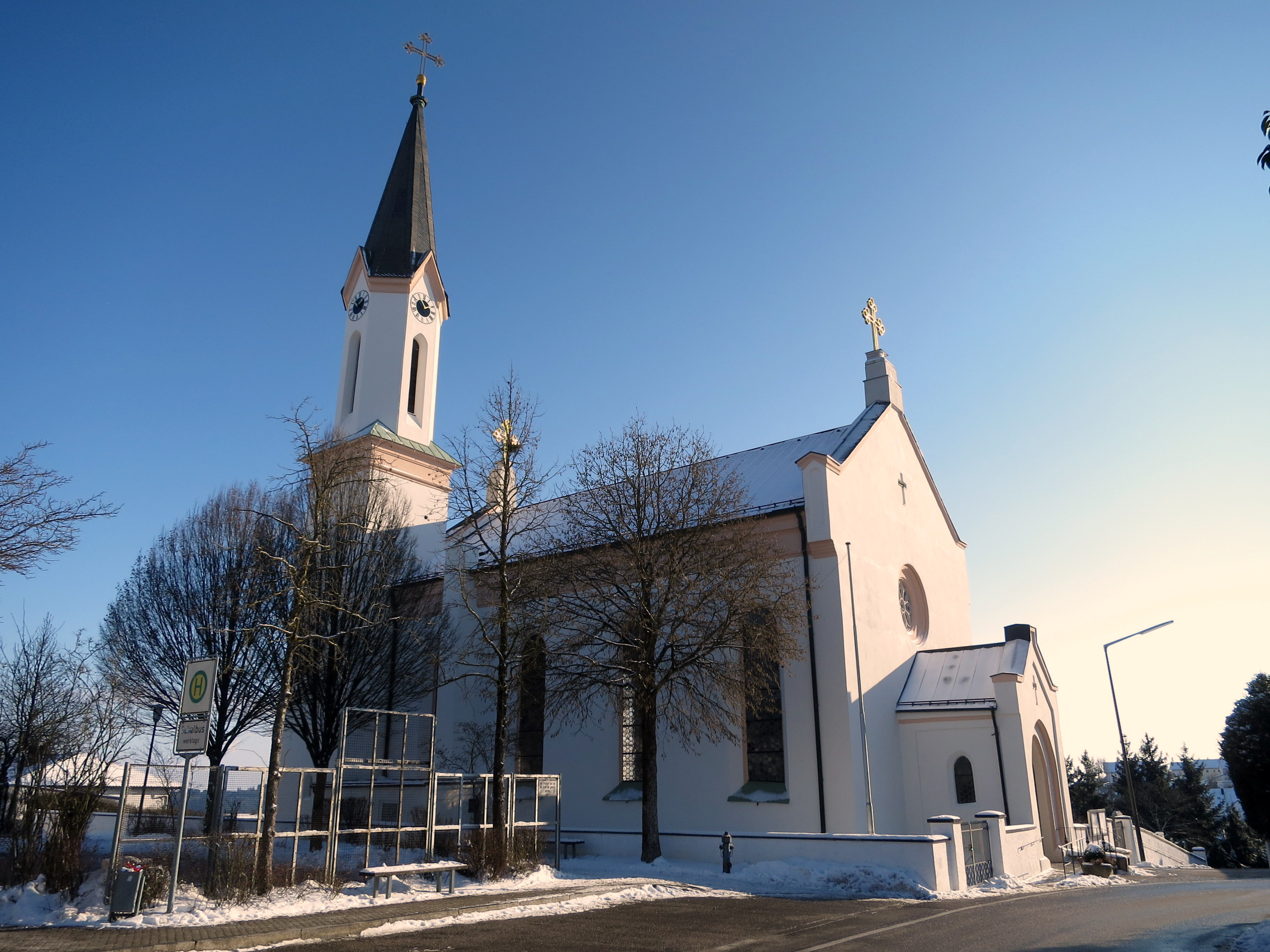
- Church of Saints Peter and Paul

- Coat of arms

- Location of Wolfersdorf within Freising district
- Interactive map of Wolfersdorf
- Location within Germany Location within Bavaria
- Coordinates: 48°29′N 11°43′E
- Country: Germany
- State: Bavaria
- Admin. region: Oberbayern
- District: Freising
- Municipal assoc.: Zolling

Government
  - Mayor (2020–26): Anita Wölfle

Area
  - Total: 26.07 km^{2} (10.07 sq mi)
- Elevation: 502 m (1,647 ft)

Population (2025-12-31)
  - Total: 2,582
  - Density: 99.04/km^{2} (256.5/sq mi)
- Time zone: UTC+01:00 (CET)
  - Summer (DST): UTC+02:00 (CEST)
- Postal codes: 85395
- Dialling codes: 08168
- Vehicle registration: FS
- Website: www.gemeinde-wolfersdorf.de

Wolfersdorf (German pronunciation: [ˈvɔlfɐsdɔʁf]) is a municipality in the district of Freising in Bavaria in Germany.
