= Zolling (Verwaltungsgemeinschaft) =

- Verwaltungsgemeinschaft
- Location of Zolling within Freising district
- Interactive map of Zolling
- Location within Germany Location within Bavaria
- Coordinates: 48°27′N 11°46′E
- Country: Germany
- State: Bavaria
- Admin. region: Upper Bavaria
- District: Freising
- Seat: Zolling
- Subdivisions: 4 municipalities

Area
  - Total: 98.39 km^{2} (37.99 sq mi)

Population (2025-12-31)
  - Total: 13,010
  - Density: 132.2/km^{2} (342.5/sq mi)
- Time zone: UTC+01:00 (CET)
  - Summer (DST): UTC+02:00 (CEST)
- Website: www.vg-zolling.de

Zolling is a Verwaltungsgemeinschaft (municipal association) in the district of Freising in Bavaria, Germany. Its seat is in Zolling.

It consists of the following municipalities:

1. Attenkirchen
2. Haag an der Amper
3. Wolfersdorf
4. Zolling
