= Paunzhausen =

- Municipality
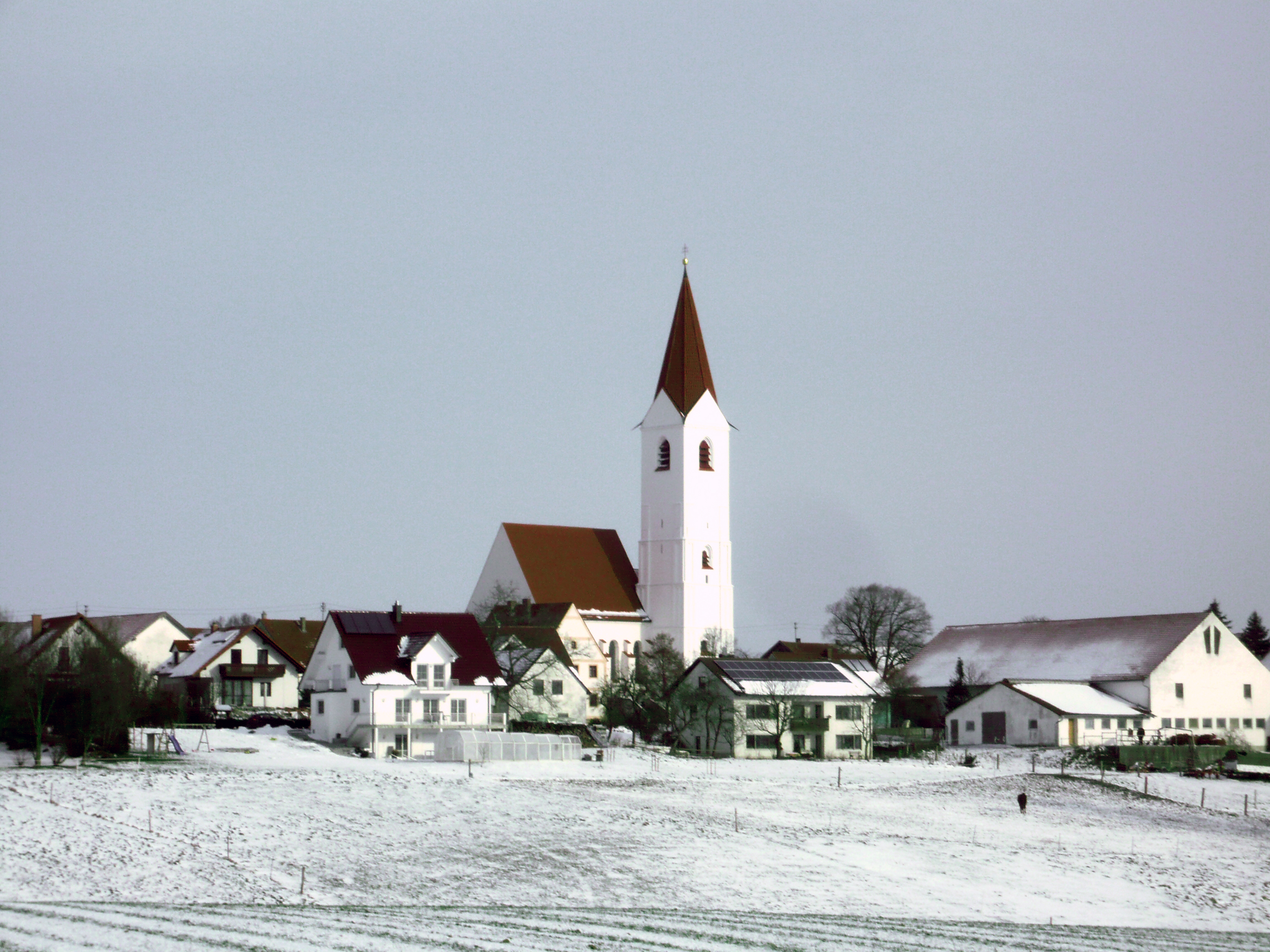
- Church of the Assumption of the Virgin Mary in Johanneck

- Coat of arms

- Location of Paunzhausen within Freising district
- Interactive map of Paunzhausen
- Location within Germany Location within Bavaria
- Coordinates: 48°29′N 11°34′E
- Country: Germany
- State: Bavaria
- Admin. region: Oberbayern
- District: Freising
- Municipal assoc.: Allershausen

Government
  - Mayor (2020–26): Johann Daniel (FW)

Area
  - Total: 12.74 km^{2} (4.92 sq mi)
- Elevation: 515 m (1,690 ft)

Population (2025-12-31)
  - Total: 1,629
  - Density: 127.9/km^{2} (331.2/sq mi)
- Time zone: UTC+01:00 (CET)
  - Summer (DST): UTC+02:00 (CEST)
- Postal codes: 85307
- Dialling codes: 08444
- Vehicle registration: FS
- Website: www.paunzhausen.de

Paunzhausen (German pronunciation: [paʊntsˈhaʊzn̩]) is a municipality in the district of Freising in Bavaria in Germany.
