= Allershausen (Verwaltungsgemeinschaft) =

- Verwaltungsgemeinschaft
- Location of Allershausen within Freising district
- Interactive map of Allershausen
- Location within Germany Location within Bavaria
- Coordinates: 48°26′N 11°36′E
- Country: Germany
- State: Bavaria
- Admin. region: Upper Bavaria
- District: Freising
- Seat: Allershausen
- Subdivisions: 2 municipalities

Area
  - Total: 39.29 km^{2} (15.17 sq mi)

Population (2025-12-31)
  - Total: 7,582
  - Density: 193.0/km^{2} (499.8/sq mi)
- Time zone: UTC+01:00 (CET)
  - Summer (DST): UTC+02:00 (CEST)
- Website: www.allershausen.de

Allershausen is a Verwaltungsgemeinschaft (municipal association) in the district of Freising in Bavaria, Germany. Its seat is in Allershausen.

It consists of the following municipalities:

1. Allershausen
2. Paunzhausen
