= Gottlob Ludwig Rabenhorst =

German botanist and lichenologist (1806–1881)

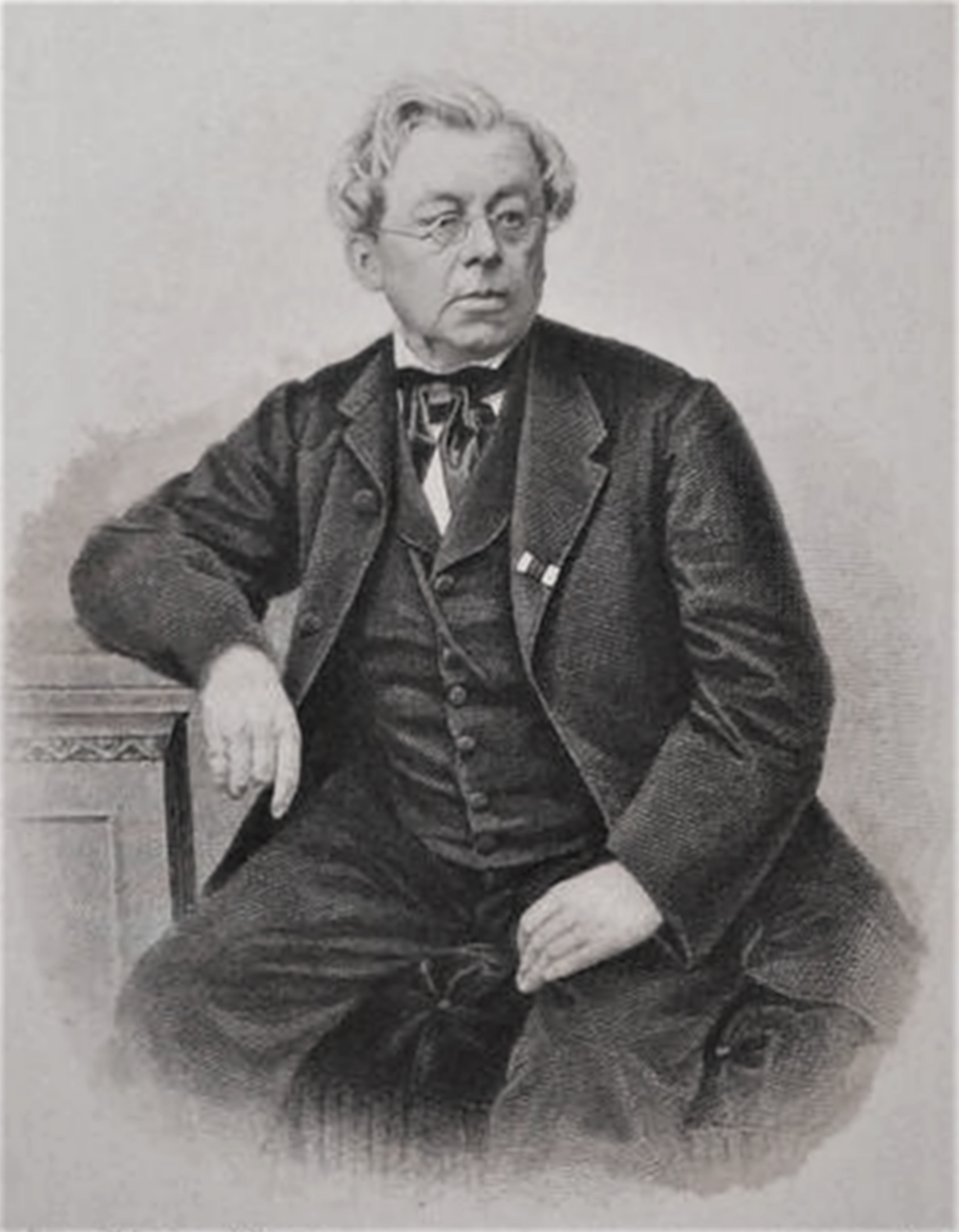
Gottlob Ludwig Rabenhorst in 1860

Gottlob Ludwig Rabenhorst (22 March 1806 – 24 April 1881) was a German botanist and mycologist.

== Biography ==
Rabenhorst was born in Treuenbrietzen. He studied in Berlin and Belzig from 1822 to 1830, worked as a pharmacist in Luckau until 1840, and received his doctorate in Jena in 1841. From 1840, he lived in Dresden, relocating to nearby Meissen in 1875, where he died aged 75.

Renowned for his research of cryptogamic flora native to central Europe, his name is associated with Dr. L. Rabenhorst's Kryptogamen-Flora von Deutschland, Oesterreich und der Schweiz. Rabenhorst edited the scientific journal Hedwigia from 1852 to 1878. He published more than 20 exsiccata works, one of them with Alexander Braun (1805–1877) and Ernst Stizenberger (1827–1895) under the title Die Characeen Europa's in getrockneten Exemplaren, unter Mitwirkung mehrerer Freunde der Botanik, gesammelt und herausgegeben von Prof. A. Braun, L. Rabenhorst und E. Stizenberger. Carl Moritz Gottsche and Rabenhorst co-edited no. 221 until no. 600 of the exsiccata series Hepaticae Europaeae. Die Lebermoose Europa's unter Mitwirkung mehrer namhafter Botaniker.

== Works ==
- Rabenhorst, L. G. Deutschlands Kryptogamen-Flora oder Handbuch zur Bestimmung der kryptogamischen Gewächse Deutschlands, der Schweiz, des Lombardisch-Venetianischen Königreich und Istriens. Leipzig: E. Kummer. 1844–1848.
  - Vol. 1. Rabenhorst, Ludwig (11 October 2023). "Deutschlands Kryptogamen-Flora: Bd. Pilze". Pilze. 1844.
  - Vol. 2. Div. 1. Rabenhorst, Ludwig (11 October 2023). "Deutschlands Kryptogamen-Flora: Bd. 1. Abth. Lichenen. 2. Abth. Algen. 3. Abth. Leber-, Laubmoose und Farrn". Lichenen. 1845.
  - Vol. 2. Div. 2. Rabenhorst, Ludwig (11 October 2023). "Deutschlands Kryptogamen-Flora oder Handbuch zur Bestimmung der kryptogamischen Gewächse Deutschlands, der Schweiz, des Lombardisch-Venetianischen Königreichs und Istriens: Algen". Algen. 1847.
  - Vol. 2. Div. 3. "Deutschlands KryptogamenFlora oder, Handbuch zur Bestimmung der kryptogamischen Gewächse Deutschlands, der Schweiz, des LombardischVenetianischen Königreichs und Istriens". E. Kummer. 11 October 2023. Leber-, Laubmoose und Farrn. 1848.
- Dr. L. Rabenhorst's Kryptogamen-Flora von Deutschland, Oesterreich und der Schweiz. Zweite Auflage (2nd ed.).Stafleu, F.A., Cowan, R.S. Stafleu, Frans Antonie (11 October 1983). Taxonomic literature : A selective guide to botanical publications and collections with dates, commentaries and types. Bohn, Scheltema & Holkema. ISBN 9789031302246. Taxonomic Literature. Ed. 2. Utrecht, Antwerpen, The Hague, Boston, 1983. Vol. IV: P—Sak. P. 467—467, 470—473, 474—528. 1214 p. ISBN 90-313-0549-9. Available at "Digital Library of the Real Jardín Botánico of Madrid". Archived from the original on 2 November 2014. Digital Library of the Royal Botanic Garden of Madrid. Some volumes were not published."Biblioteca Digital del Real Jard?n Bot?nico". Archived from the original on 3 November 2014.
  - Vol. 1. Die Pilze.
    - Div. 1. Schizomyceten, Saccharomyceten und Basidiomyceten. Winter, G. 1880–1885.
    - Div. 2. Ascomyceten: Gymnoasceen. Winter, G. 1884–1887.
    - Div. 3. Ascomyceten: Hysteriaceen. Rehm, H. 1887–1896
    - Div. 4. Phycomycetes. Fischer, A. 1892.
    - Div. 5. Ascomyceten: Tuberaceen. Fischer, E. 1896–1897.
    - Div. 6. Fungi imperfecti: Hyalin-sporige Sphaerioideen. Allescher, A. 1898–1903.
    - Div. 7. Fungi imperfecti: Hyalin-sporige Sphaerioideen. Allescher, A. 1901–1903.
    - Div. 8. Fungi imperfecti: Hyphomycetes. Lindau, G. 1904–1907.
    - Div. 9. Fungi imperfecti: Hyphomycetes. Lindau, G. 1907–1910.
    - Div. 10. Myxogasteres. Schinz, H. 1912–1920.
  - Vol. 2. Die Meeresalgen. Hauck, F. 1882–1889.
  - Vol. 3. Die Farnpflanzen. Luerssen, C. 1884–1889.
  - Vol. 4. Die Laubmoose.
    - Div. 1. Sphagnaceae. Limpricht, K.G. 1885–1889.
    - Div. 2. Bryinae. Limpricht, K.G. 1890–1895.
    - Div. 3. Hypnaceae und Nachträge. Limpricht, K.G.; Limpricht, H. 1895–1903.
    - Ergänzungsband (Supplement). Die Laubmoose Europas. Andreales — Bryales. Mönkemeyer, W. 1927.
  - Vol. 5. Die Characeen. Migula, W. 1895–1897.
  - Vol. 6. Die Lebermoose
    - Div. 1. Lebermoose. Müller, K. 1905–1911.
    - Div. 2. Lebermoose. Müller, K. 1912–1916.
  - Vol. 7. Die Kieselalgen.
    - Div. 1. Kieselalgen. Hustedt, F. 1930.
    - Div. 2. Kieselalgen. Hustedt, F. 1931–1959.
    - Div. 3. Kieselalgen. Hustedt, F. 1961–1966.
  - Vol. 8. Flechtenparasiten. Keissler, K.v. 1930.
  - Vol. 9. Die Flechten.
    - Div. 1 (1). Moriolaceae — Epigloeaceae — Dermatocarpaceae. Keissler, K.v.; Zschacke, H. 1933–1934.
    - Div. 1 (2). Pyrenulaceae — Mycoporaceae — Coniocarpineae. Keissler, K.v. 1937–1938.
    - Div. 2 (1). Arthoniaceae — Coenogoniaceae. Redinger, K.M. 1937–1938.
    - Div. 2 (2). Cyanophili. Köfaragó-Gyelnik, V. 1940.
    - Div. 3. Lecidaceae, not published.
    - Div. 4 (1). Cladoniaceae — Umbilicariaceae. Frey, E. 1932–1933.
    - Div. 4 (2). Cladonia. Sandstede, H. 1931.
    - Div. 5 (1). Acarosporaceae und Thelocarpaceae — Pertusariaceae. Magnusson, A.H.; Erichsen, C.F.E. 1934–1936.
    - Div. 5 (3). Parmeliaceae. Hillmann, J. 1936.
    - Div. 5 (4). Usneaceae. Keissler, K.v. 1958–1960.
    - Div. 6. Teloschistaceae — Physciaceae. Hillmann, J.; Lynge, B.A. 1935. Caloplacaceae — Buelliaceae, not published.
  - Vol. 10. Flagellatae.
    - Div. 1. Chrysophyceae, not published.
    - Div. 2. Silicoflagellatae — Coccolithineae. Gemeinhardt, K.; Schiller, J. 1930.
    - Div. 3 (1). Dinoflagellatae (Peridineae). Schiller, J. 1932–1933.
    - Div. 3 (2). Dinoflagellatae (Peridineae). Schiller, J. 1935–1937.
    - Div. 4. Cryptomonadales, Chloromonadales und Euglenales, not published.
  - Vol. 11. Heterokonten. Pascher, A. 1937–1939.
  - Vol. 12. Chlorophyceae
    - Div. 1. Volvocales und Tetrasporales, not published.
    - Div. 2. Protococcales, not published.
    - Div. 3. Ulotrichales, not published.
    - Div. 4. Oedogoniales. Gemeinhardt, K. 1938–1940.
    - Div. 5. Siphonocladiales und Siphonales, not published.
  - Vol. 13. Conjugatae.
    - Div. 1 (1). Desmidiales: Desmidiaceen. Krieger, W. 1933–1937.
    - Div. 1 (2). Desmidiales: Desmidiaceen. Krieger, W. 1939.
    - Div. 2. Zygnemales. Kolkwitz, R.; Krieger, H. 1941–1944.
  - Vol. 14. Cyanophyceae. Geitler, L. 1930–1932.
  - Vol. 15. Not published.
    - Rhodophyceae des Süsswassers. Schmidt, O. Ch.
    - Phaeophyceae des Süsswassers. Schmidt, O. Ch.
    - Allgemeines über das System — Generalregister.

== See also ==
- Category:Taxa named by Gottlob Ludwig Rabenhorst
