= Neufahrn bei Freising =

Neufahrn b.Freising
- Municipality
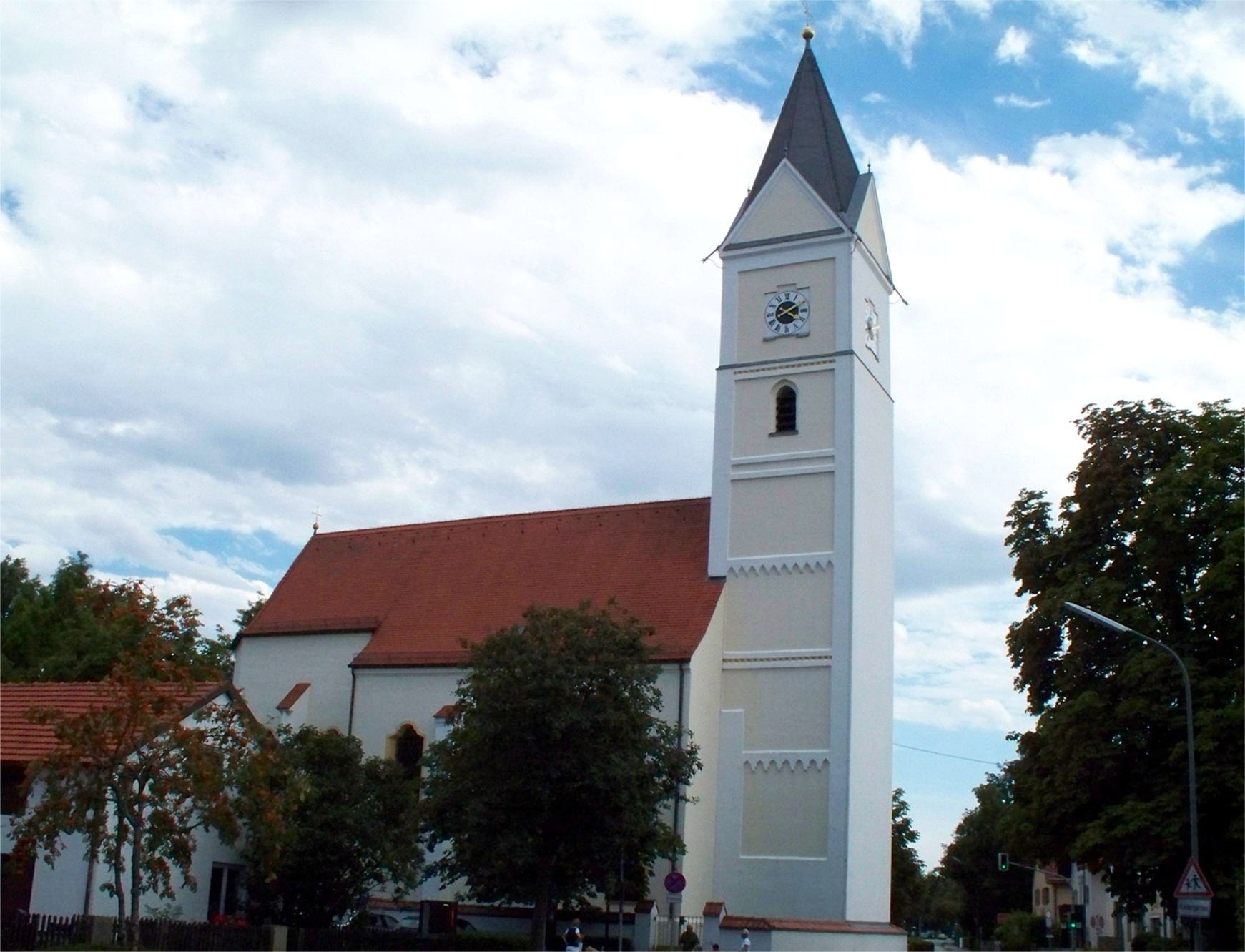
- Pilgrimage Church of Saint Wilgefortis

- Coat of arms

- Location of Neufahrn b.Freising within Freising district
- Interactive map of Neufahrn b.Freising
- Location within Germany Location within Bavaria
- Coordinates: 48°19′N 11°40′E
- Country: Germany
- State: Bavaria
- Admin. region: Oberbayern
- District: Freising

Government
  - Mayor (2020–26): Franz Heilmeier (Greens)

Area
  - Total: 45.54 km^{2} (17.58 sq mi)
- Elevation: 464 m (1,522 ft)

Population (2025-12-31)
  - Total: 21,066
  - Density: 462.6/km^{2} (1,198/sq mi)
- Time zone: UTC+01:00 (CET)
  - Summer (DST): UTC+02:00 (CEST)
- Postal codes: 85369–85375
- Dialling codes: 08165
- Vehicle registration: FS
- Website: www.neufahrn.de

Neufahrn bei Freising (German pronunciation: [ˈnɔʏfaːɐ̯n baɪ ˈfʁaɪzɪŋ], lit. 'Neufahrn near Freising') is a municipality in the district of Freising, in Bavaria, Germany. It has about 20,000 inhabitants and is located near the river Isar, 12 km southwest of Freising and 20 km northeast of Munich.

It is a stop on the Munich–Regensburg line and is served by S1 trains, running from Munich to Freising.

== Gallery ==
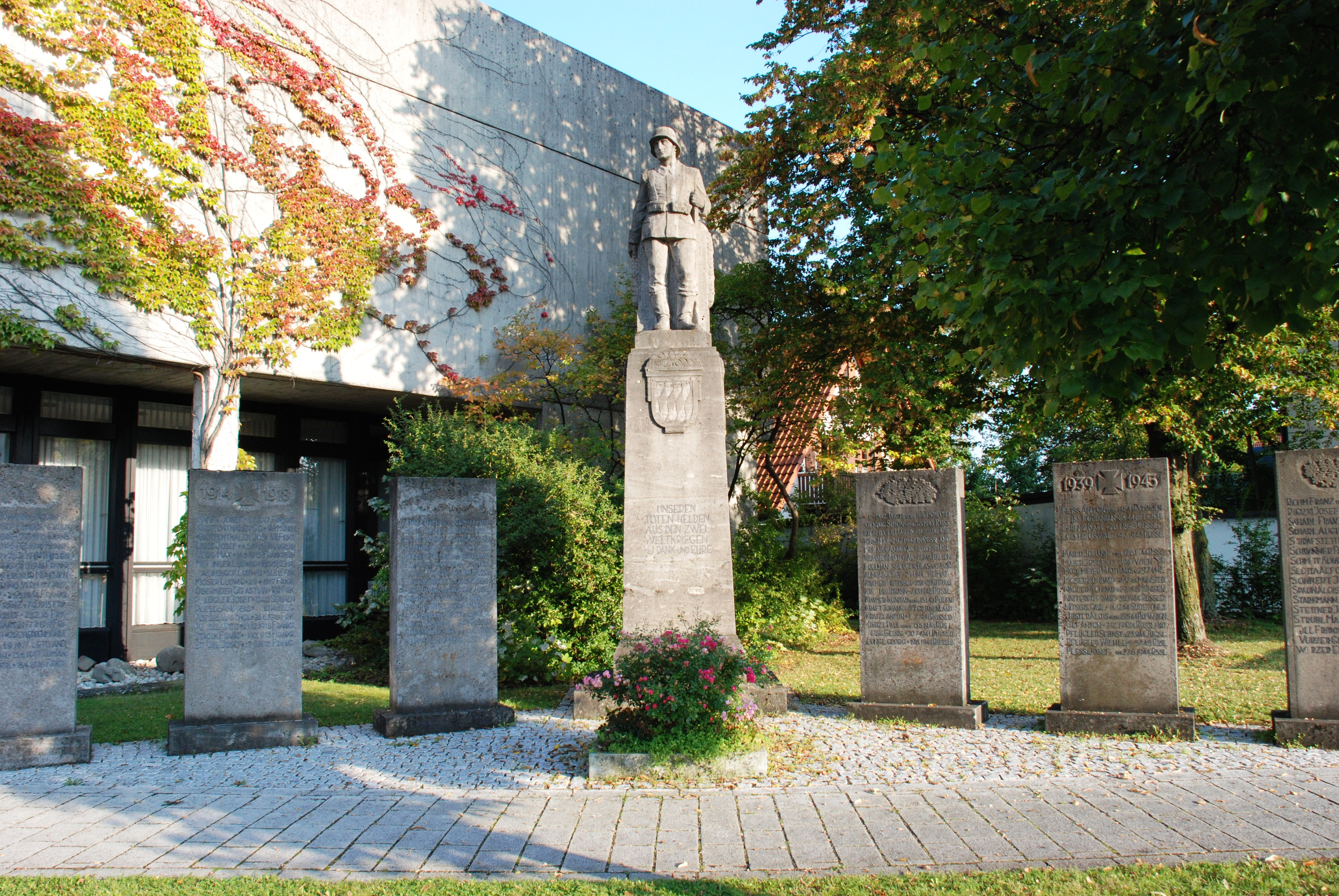
War memorial in front of town hall
