= Haag an der Amper =

- Municipality
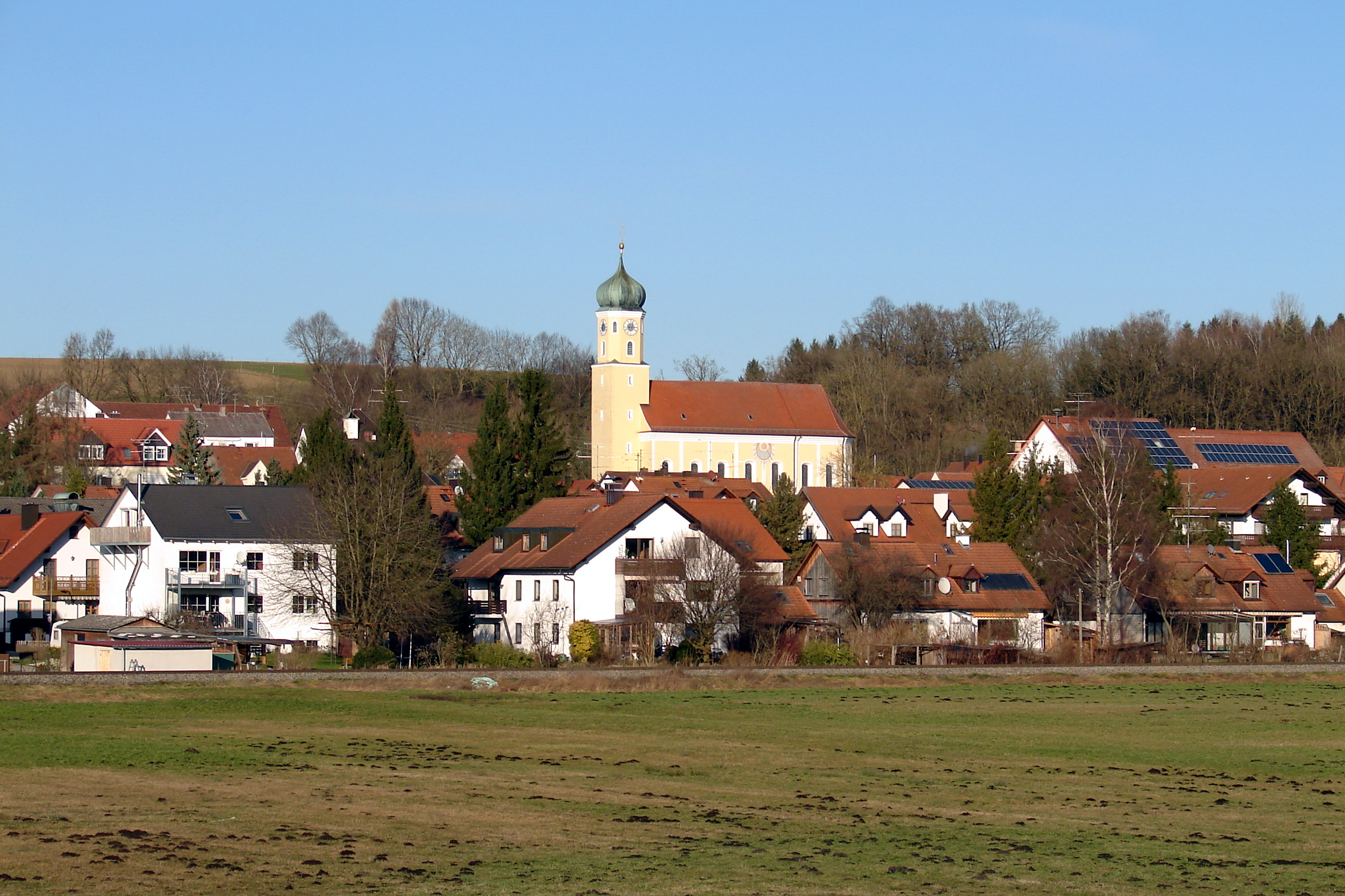
- Haag an der Amper with the Church of Saint Lawrence

- Coat of arms

- Location of Haag an der Amper within Freising district
- Interactive map of Haag an der Amper
- Location within Germany Location within Bavaria
- Coordinates: 48°28′N 11°50′E
- Country: Germany
- State: Bavaria
- Admin. region: Oberbayern
- District: Freising
- Municipal assoc.: Zolling

Government
  - Mayor (2020–26): Anton Geier

Area
  - Total: 21.7 km^{2} (8.4 sq mi)
- Elevation: 440 m (1,440 ft)

Population (2025-12-31)
  - Total: 2,718
  - Density: 125/km^{2} (324/sq mi)
- Time zone: UTC+01:00 (CET)
  - Summer (DST): UTC+02:00 (CEST)
- Postal codes: 85410
- Dialling codes: 08167
- Vehicle registration: FS
- Website: https://www.gemeinde-haag.de/

Haag an der Amper (German pronunciation: [ˈhaːk ʔan deːɐ̯ ˈʔampɐ], lit. 'Haag on the Amper'; official name: Haag a.d.Amper) is a municipality in the district of Freising in Bavaria in Germany.
