= Zolling =

- Municipality
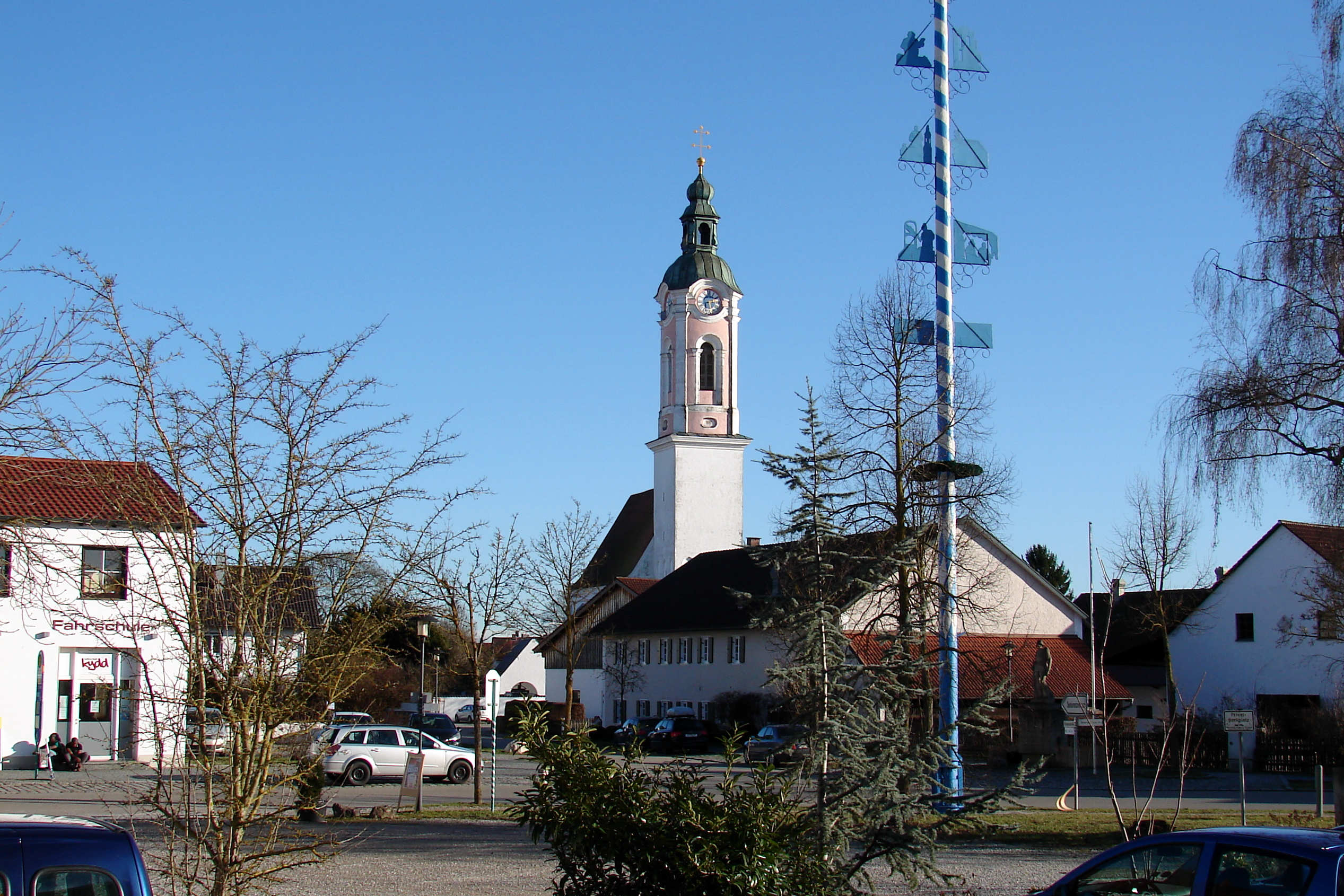
- Market square with the Church of Saint John the Baptist and maypole

- Coat of arms

- Location of Zolling within Freising district
- Interactive map of Zolling
- Location within Germany Location within Bavaria
- Coordinates: 48°27′N 11°46′E
- Country: Germany
- State: Bavaria
- Admin. region: Oberbayern
- District: Freising
- Municipal assoc.: Zolling

Government
  - Mayor (2020–26): Helmut Priller

Area
  - Total: 34.53 km^{2} (13.33 sq mi)
- Elevation: 429 m (1,407 ft)

Population (2025-12-31)
  - Total: 4,976
  - Density: 144.1/km^{2} (373.2/sq mi)
- Time zone: UTC+01:00 (CET)
  - Summer (DST): UTC+02:00 (CEST)
- Postal codes: 85406
- Dialling codes: 08167
- Vehicle registration: FS
- Website: www.zolling.de

Zolling (German pronunciation: [ˈtsɔlɪŋ]) is a municipality in the Bavarian district of Freising. Associated villages are: Anglberg, Flitzing, Thann, Palzing, Oberappersdorf, and Appersdorf.

Zolling lies 6 km to the north of Freising.

== Gallery ==
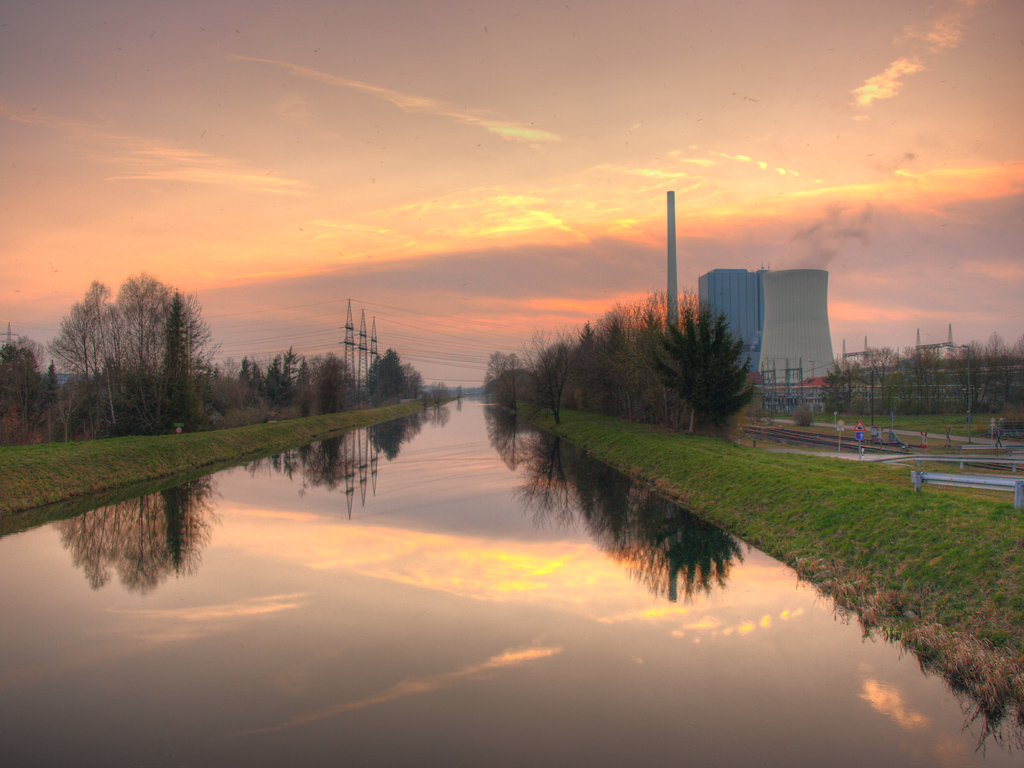
Zolling power plant

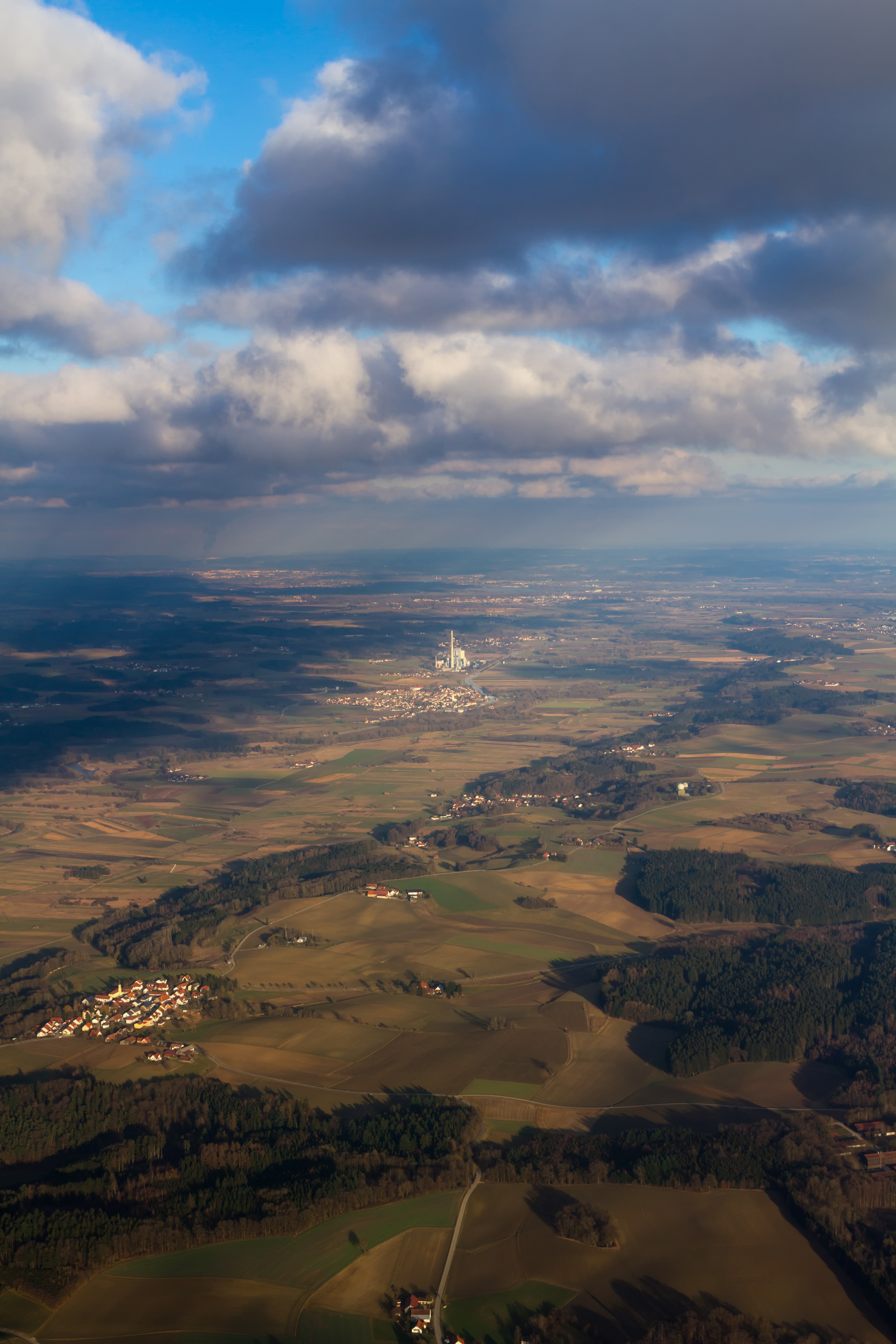
Bird's eye view of Zolling with its power plant

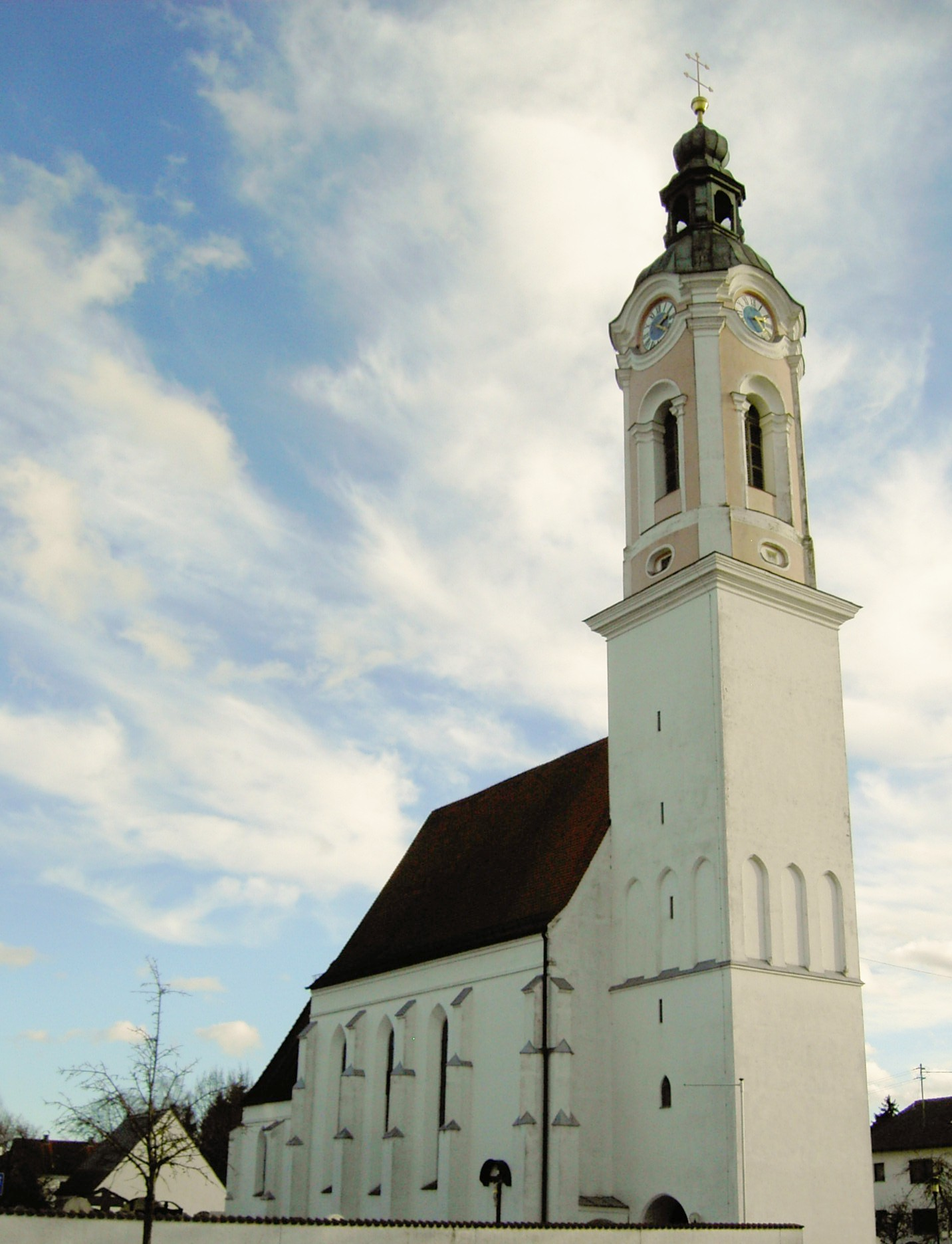
St. John's church in Zolling
