= Fahrenzhausen =

- Municipality
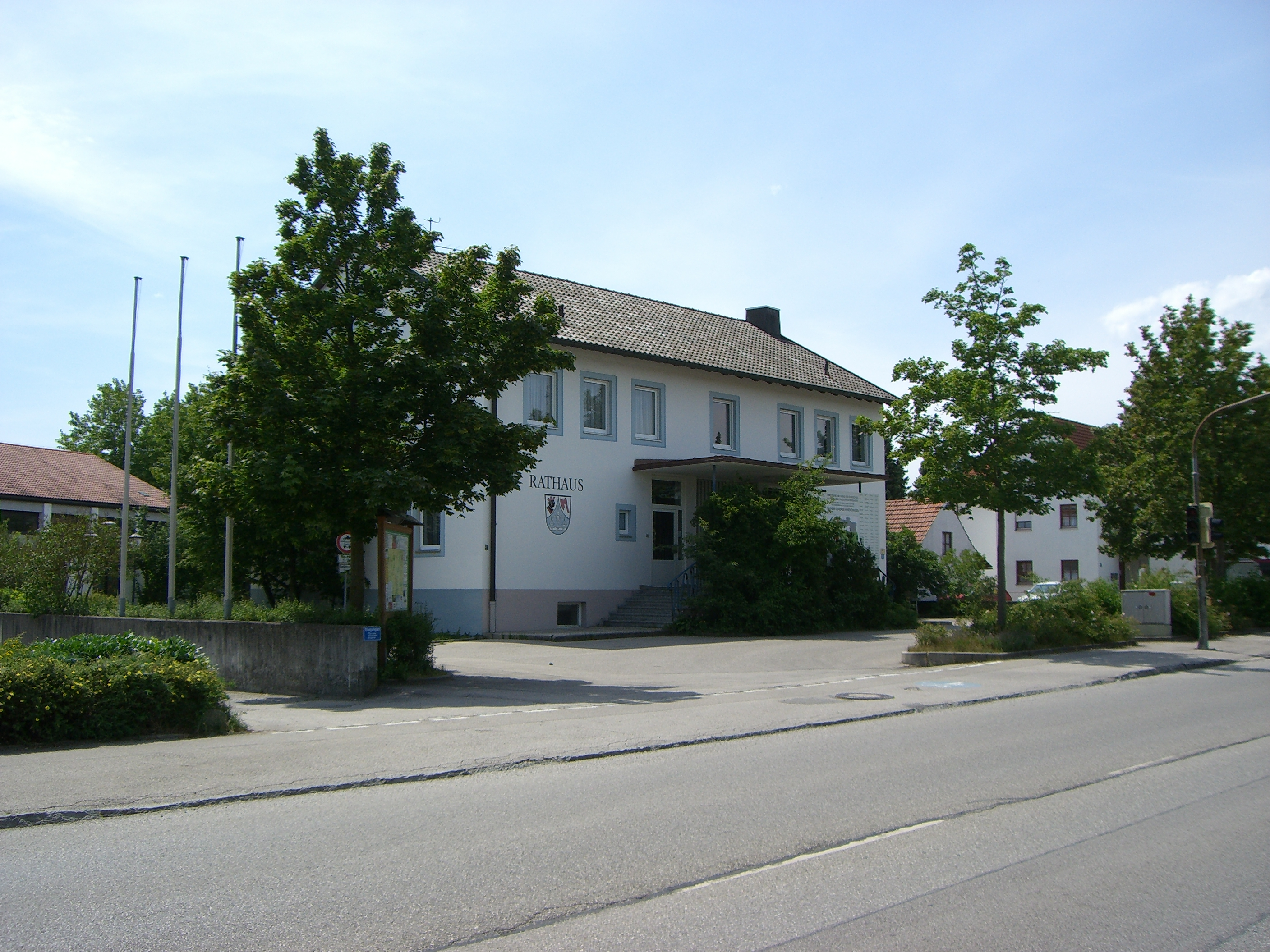
- Town hall

- Coat of arms

- Location of Fahrenzhausen within Freising district
- Interactive map of Fahrenzhausen
- Location within Germany Location within Bavaria
- Coordinates: 48°21′N 11°33′E
- Country: Germany
- State: Bavaria
- Admin. region: Oberbayern
- District: Freising

Government
  - Mayor (2023–29): Susanne Hartmann

Area
  - Total: 37.64 km^{2} (14.53 sq mi)
- Elevation: 465 m (1,526 ft)

Population (2025-12-31)
  - Total: 5,087
  - Density: 135.1/km^{2} (350.0/sq mi)
- Time zone: UTC+01:00 (CET)
  - Summer (DST): UTC+02:00 (CEST)
- Postal codes: 85777
- Dialling codes: 08133
- Vehicle registration: FS
- Website: www.fahrenzhausen.de

Fahrenzhausen (German pronunciation: [faːʁəntsˈhaʊzn̩]) is a municipality located on the river Amper in the district of Freising in Bavaria in Germany. The town is about 25 Kilometers north of Munich.

== Geography ==
Fahrenzhausen has several villages in its community: Appercha, Bachenhausen, Bergfeld, Grosseisenbach, Grossnöbach, Jarzt, Kammerberg, Lauterbach, Unterbruck, Viehbach and Weng.

The areas around Fahrenzhausen consists of small rivers, creeks, marshland, forests and farmlands. The area is home to a variety of rare animal and plant species.

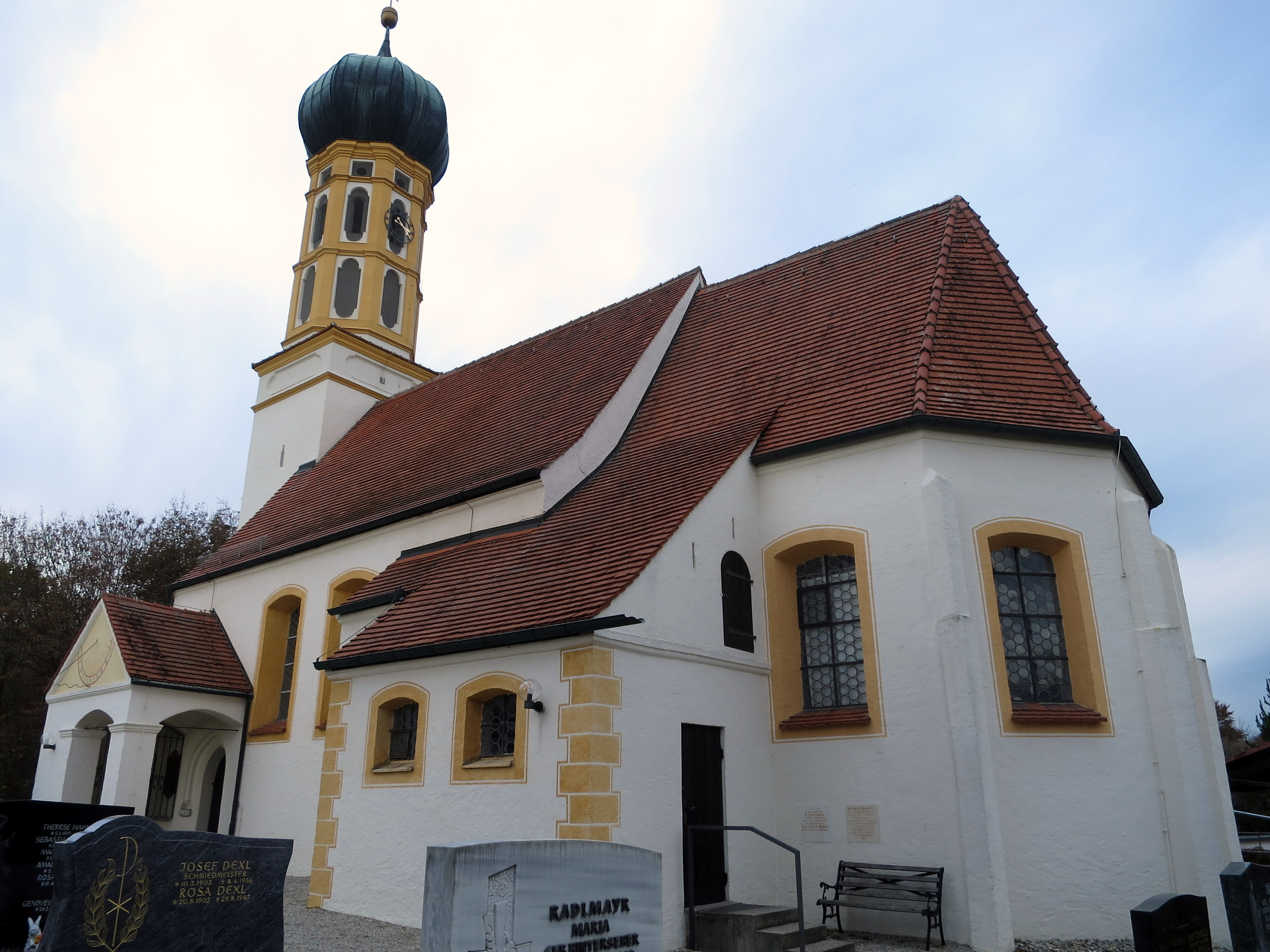
Church in Fahrenzhausen

== History ==
There is archeological evidence that the area was inhabited as far back as the Bronze Age. A Roman outpost was excavated as a station maintaining a section of the Roman Road from Augsburg to Regensburg just south of the modern community.

The village was first mentioned by name in 1020 AD under the name "Varnolveshusa", (perhaps a certain "Farnolf" or "Varnolf" was the founder of the settlement). It was mentioned again in 1280 during the Wittelsbach Dynasty with the name 'Vornolzhusn'. A local Catholic church was first mentioned in 1315.

Fahrenzhausen and the surrounding villages were most likely affected during the Thirty Years War, particularly during the Swedish march to Munich in 1632, or even the French attack in the Freising and Dachau area in 1648.

During the Napoleonic Wars, French and Bavarian troops marched from Munich along the Isar towards Freising and Landshut, perhaps some units passing through the Fahrenzhausen area. They were en route to fight at the Battle of Landshut and the Battle of Eckmühl in April 1809.

Fahrenzhausen became an independent political municipality during the Administrative Reforms in Bavaria in 1818.

On June 25, 1844, a violent hailstorm destroyed all crops in Fahrenzhausen and neighboring villages. The next morning, the catholic faithful made a procession march from Fahrenzhausen to nearby Westerndorf, petitioning and praying to be spared such terrible storms in the future. The procession has taken place every year ever since, including during the two World Wars. It only had to be canceled in the Corona years 2020 and 2021.

Near the end of the Second World War, units of the U.S. Army passed through Fahrenzhausen and the surrounding areas in late April 1945, shortly before the liberation of Dachau and Munich.

During the Bavarian municipal reforms of 1972, several communities were added to Fahrenzhausen.

The celebrations for the 1000th anniversary of the founding of Fahrenzhausen in 2020 were largely canceled due to the COVID-19 pandemic.

== Population ==
Between 1988 and 2018 the community grew from 3,166 to 5,041 inhabitants or by 59.2%.

== Businesses and Services ==
Fahrenzhausen has several manufacturing companies including various small businesses and shops, mostly along its main road, (B-13). Most notable and oldest is the Andreas Karl Company, since 1935, (designing and building industrial and scientific workstations). Second oldest business is the Backery Kistenpfennig, founded over 50 years ago in Fahrenzhausen and now has over 20 bakeries all over the greater Munich area. There are several significant buildings under historical/cultural protection, many of them old churches. Also included is the Wirtshaus in Fahrenzhausen, as well as the Gasthaus and the manor house (Schloss) in Kammerberg.

The Mayor (Bürgermeister) of Fahrenzhausen was Heinrich Stadlbauer of the Free Citizens Party (Freien Bürgerliste) since 2014. On June 1, 2022, Mayor Stadlbauer died. Elections for a new Mayor took place on September 25, 2022. After a second-round of local elections, Susanne Hartmann of the FDP Party was elected Mayor on October 9.

Fahrenzhausen has two sports clubs: FC Ampertal Unterbruck, and Spielvereinigung Kammerberg.

== Unterbruck ==
Unterbruck, just 1 Kilometer south of Fahrenzhausen, is situated directly on the Amper River. Because of this, a bridge was built as early as the 12th century so that mail and carriage traffic can go either south to Munich or north to Ingolstadt. Later on it became a toll bridge. Unterbruck also housed a post office, an inn, and a sawmill.

During the War of the Austrian Succession,(1740–1748) the bridge at Unterbrück was burned down in 1745 in an attempt to halt the Austrian advance.

Unterbruck is also known for its red-brick, neo-gothic chapel (St. Anna), built in 1859.

In the early 20th century the community built a water-powered electric plant.

In August 2025 a historical exhibition took place at a local bank in Unterbruck, showing old photographs, sketches and newspaper articles from Unterbück over the past 200 years.

== Literature ==
- Hans Schertl, "Kirchen und Kapellen im Dachauer Land (German)"
