= Freising (district) =

Coordinates: 48°30′N 11°50′E

- District
- Flag Coat of arms
- Country: Germany
- State: Bavaria
- Adm. region: Upper Bavaria
- Capital: Freising

Government
  - District admin.: Helmut Petz (FW)

Area
  - Total: 800 km^{2} (310 sq mi)

Population (31 December 2025)
  - Total: 184,399
  - Density: 230/km^{2} (600/sq mi)
- Time zone: UTC+01:00 (CET)
  - Summer (DST): UTC+02:00 (CEST)
- Vehicle registration: FS
- Website: lra-freising.bayern.de

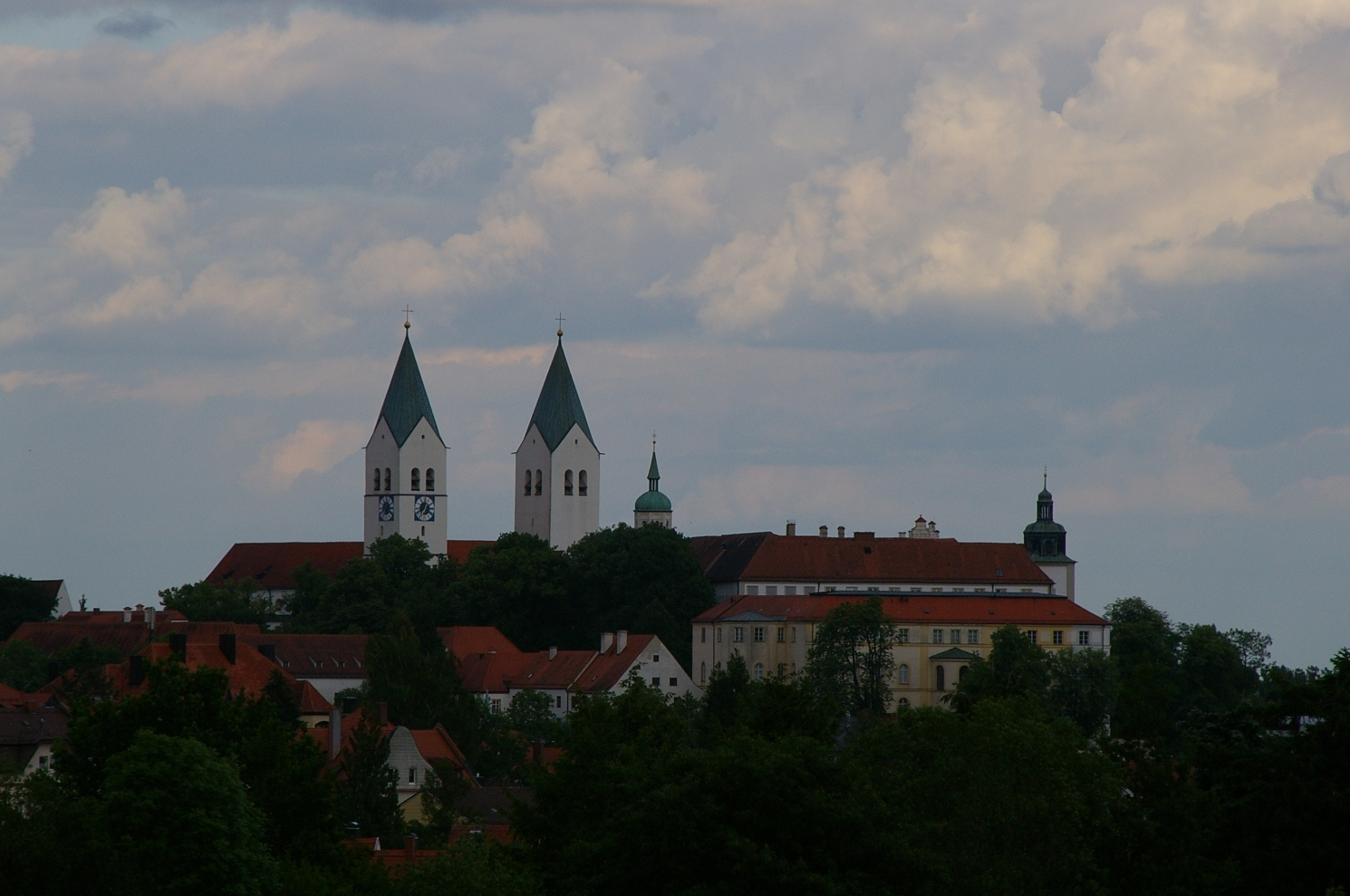
Freising

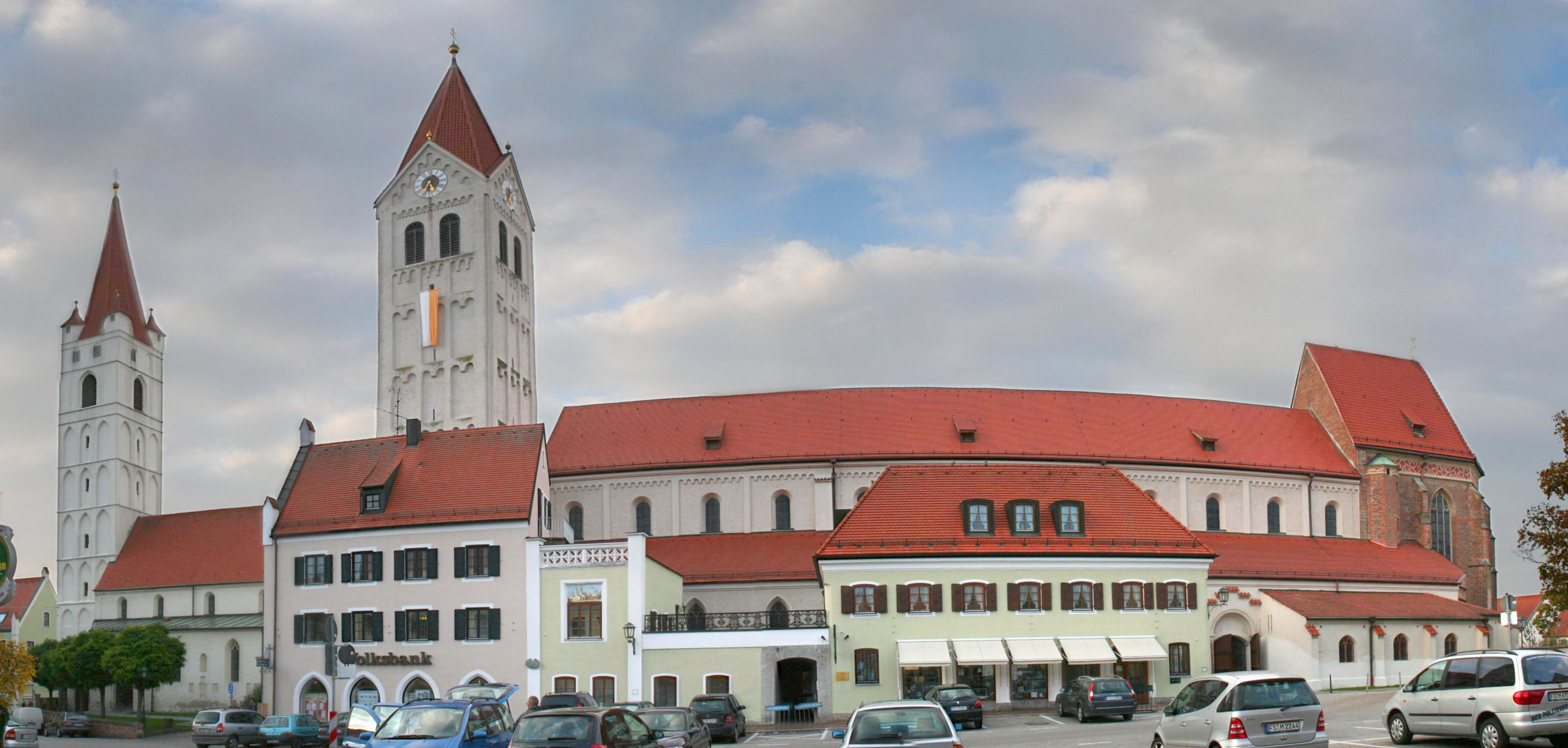
Moosburg

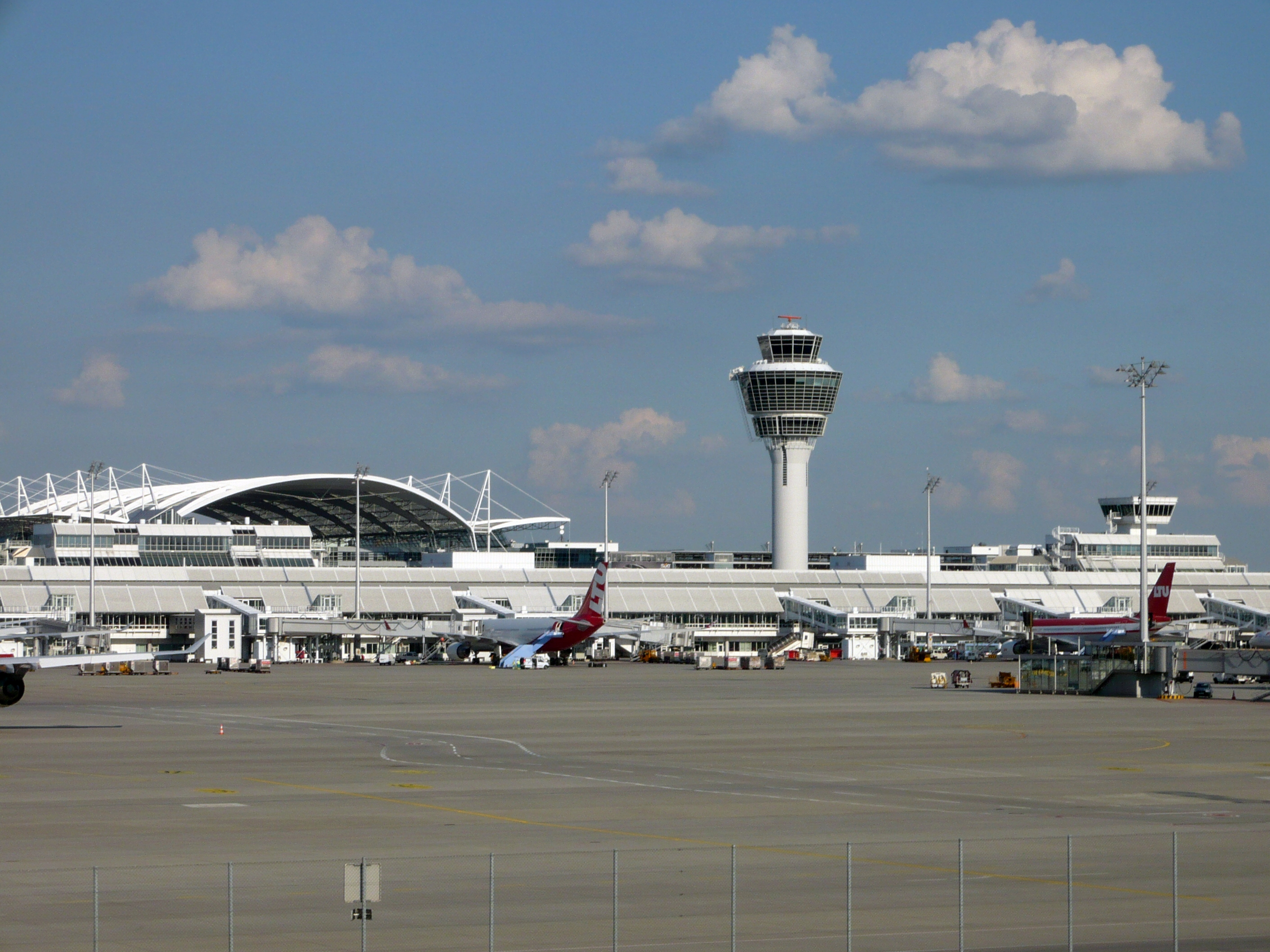
Munich Airport

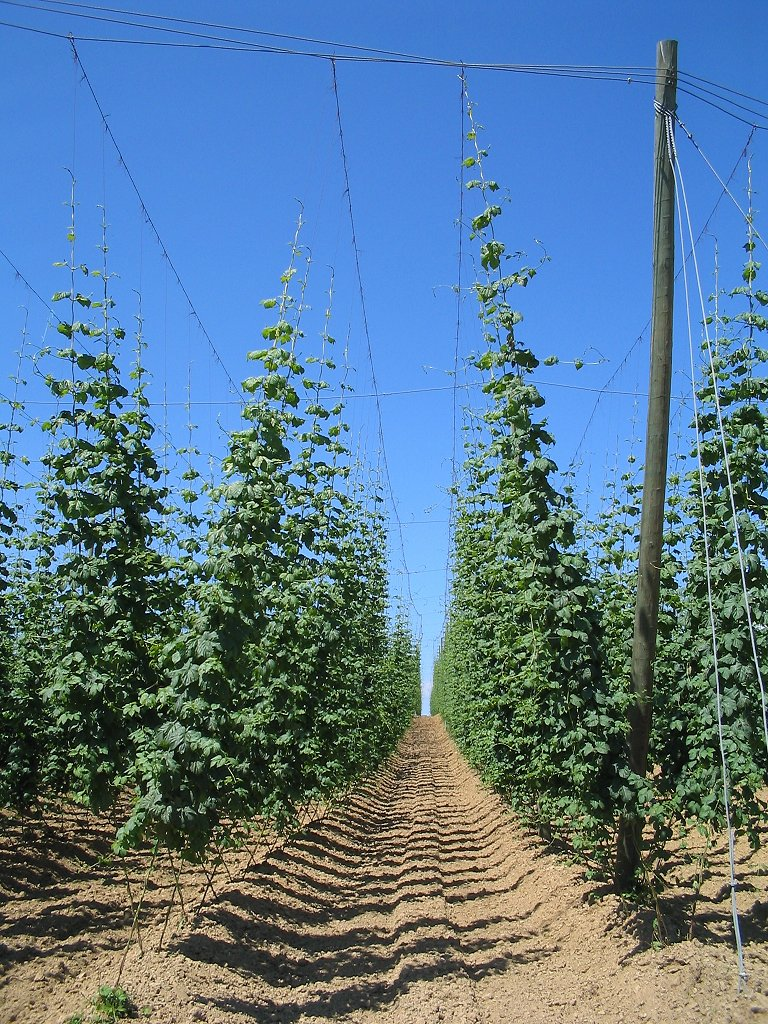
Hop garden in the Hallertau

Freising is a Landkreis (district) in Bavaria, Germany. Following a recent ranking of the German magazine Focus-Money comparing all German districts it is number one concerning economic growth abilities. It is bounded by (from the north and clockwise) the districts of Kelheim, Landshut, Erding, Munich, Dachau and Pfaffenhofen. The district is located north of the Munich metropolitan area. The Isar and Amper rivers run in parallel from southwest to northeast. North of the rivers there is the Hallertau, a hilly region mainly used for growing hop.

== History ==
In the Holy Roman Empire, Freising was a clerical state ruled by the bishops. In 1803, when the clerical states of Germany were dissolved, the region was annexed by Bavaria.

== Coat of arms ==
The coat of arms displays:

- the blue and white checkered pattern of Bavaria
- the rose from the arms of the medieval county of Moosburg
- The "Freising Moor's head"

=== The Freising Moor's head ===
The Moor's head is a controversial charge in the coat of arms, which could represent one of many different persons:

- One of the three Magi (one of them is shown as a Moor)
- Saints who were thought to be Moors:
  - Saint Maurice (Egyptian, but depicted as a Moor during the Crusades, likely for propaganda purposes)
  - Saint Zeno of Verona (probably a Berber)
  - Saint Sigismund of Burgundy (not a Moor, but mixed up with Saint Maurice)
- A black Moor king
- St. Corbinian, who was not a Moor, but whose pictures might have become darker over time
- Another person or meaning lost in time

There is a crown on the Moor's head, which probably indicated that the territory of the Bishop of Freising was autonomous.

== Towns and municipalities ==
Clickable map of towns and municipalities in the district

Towns
1. Freising
2. Moosburg an der Isar

Märkte

1. Au in der Hallertau
2. Nandlstadt
Municipalities
1. Eching
2. Fahrenzhausen
3. Hallbergmoos
4. Hohenkammer
5. Kirchdorf an der Amper

6. Kranzberg
7. Langenbach
8. Marzling
9. Neufahrn bei Freising
10. Rudelzhausen

Verwaltungsgemeinschaften
| 1. Allershausen; 1. Allershausen^{1}; 2. Paunzhausen | 2. Mauern; 1. Gammelsdorf; 2. Hörgertshausen; 3. Mauern^{1}; 4. Wang | 3. Zolling; 1. Attenkirchen; 2. Haag an der Amper; 3. Wolfersdorf; 4. Zolling^{1} |
^{1}seat of the Verwaltungsgemeinschaft
