= Hörgertshausen =

- Municipality
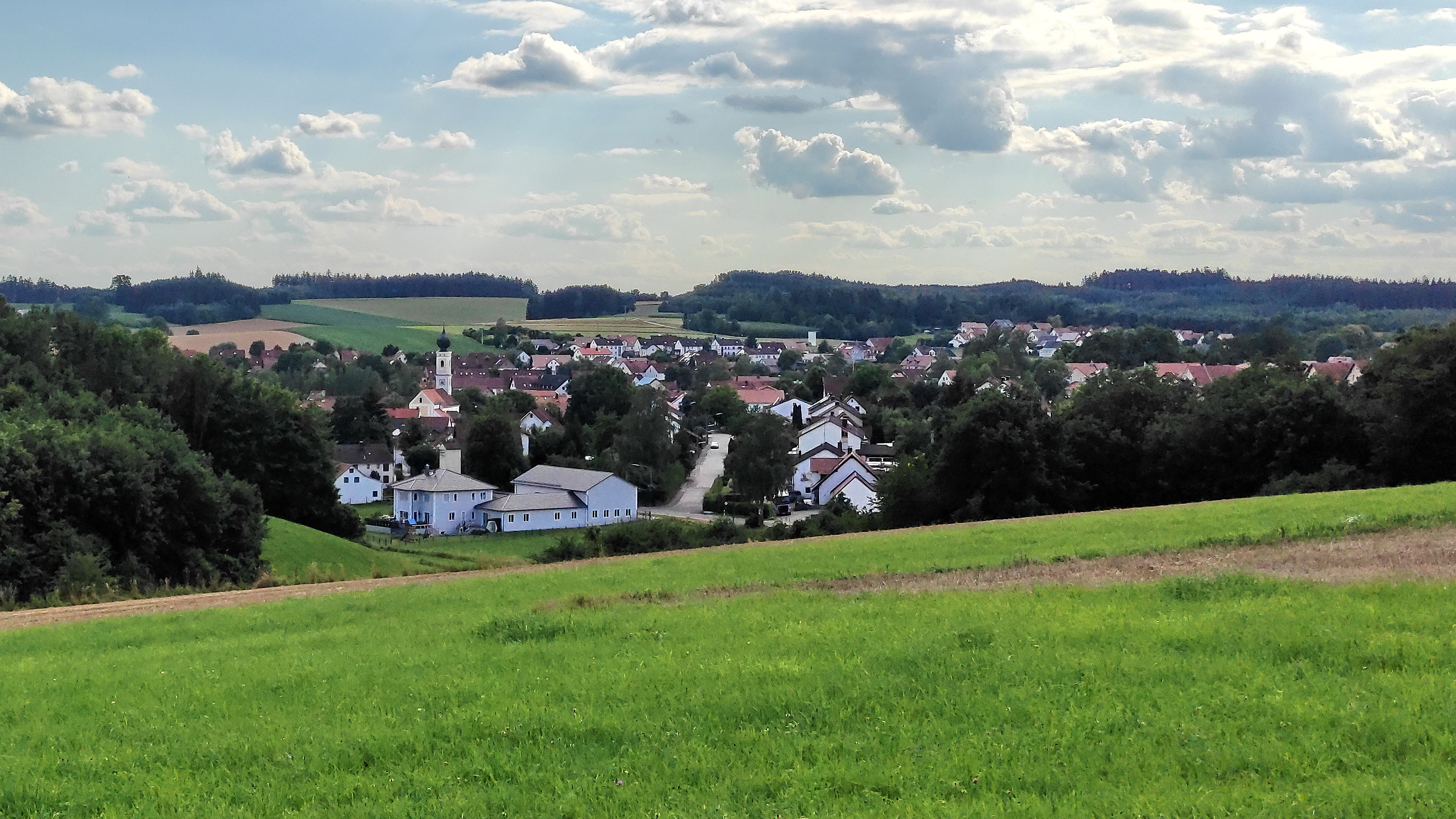
- Hörgertshausen seen from the north

- Coat of arms

- Location of Hörgertshausen within Freising district
- Interactive map of Hörgertshausen
- Location within Germany Location within Bavaria
- Coordinates: 48°33′N 11°52′E
- Country: Germany
- State: Bavaria
- Admin. region: Oberbayern
- District: Freising
- Municipal assoc.: Mauern

Government
  - Mayor (2020–26): Michael Hobmaier

Area
  - Total: 21.48 km^{2} (8.29 sq mi)
- Elevation: 453 m (1,486 ft)

Population (2025-12-31)
  - Total: 1,973
  - Density: 91.85/km^{2} (237.9/sq mi)
- Time zone: UTC+01:00 (CET)
  - Summer (DST): UTC+02:00 (CEST)
- Postal codes: 85413
- Dialling codes: 08764
- Vehicle registration: FS
- Website: www.gemeinde-hoergertshausen.de

Hörgertshausen (German pronunciation: [hœʁɡɐtsˈhaʊzn̩]) is a municipality in the district of Freising in Bavaria in Germany.

== History ==
Pre-Christian Celtic graves shows that there has been settlement for a long time. But the first official mention of the village called "Herigoldshusa" (the house of Herigold) was in a donation of Emperor Arnulf of Carinthia to his vasal Earl Luitbold Cholo in 899. In 1081 the possessions of Kuno II. of Rott were founded to the Cloister Rott while he fell in military service for Emperor Henry IV. From 1549 until the 19. century it was the so-called Hofmark by the Earls of Seyboltsdorf. In 1550, they built the Castle Hörgertshausen. In 1661, half of the village was destroyed by a blaze but also reconstructed in the same year. In 1848, Hörgertshausen became an autonomous municipality. In 1852, the Castle was destructed. Since 1978, Hörgertshausen is part of the association of administrations Mauern, which consists of the municipalities of Hörgertshausen, Mauern, Gammelsdorf and Wang.

== Main sights and culture ==
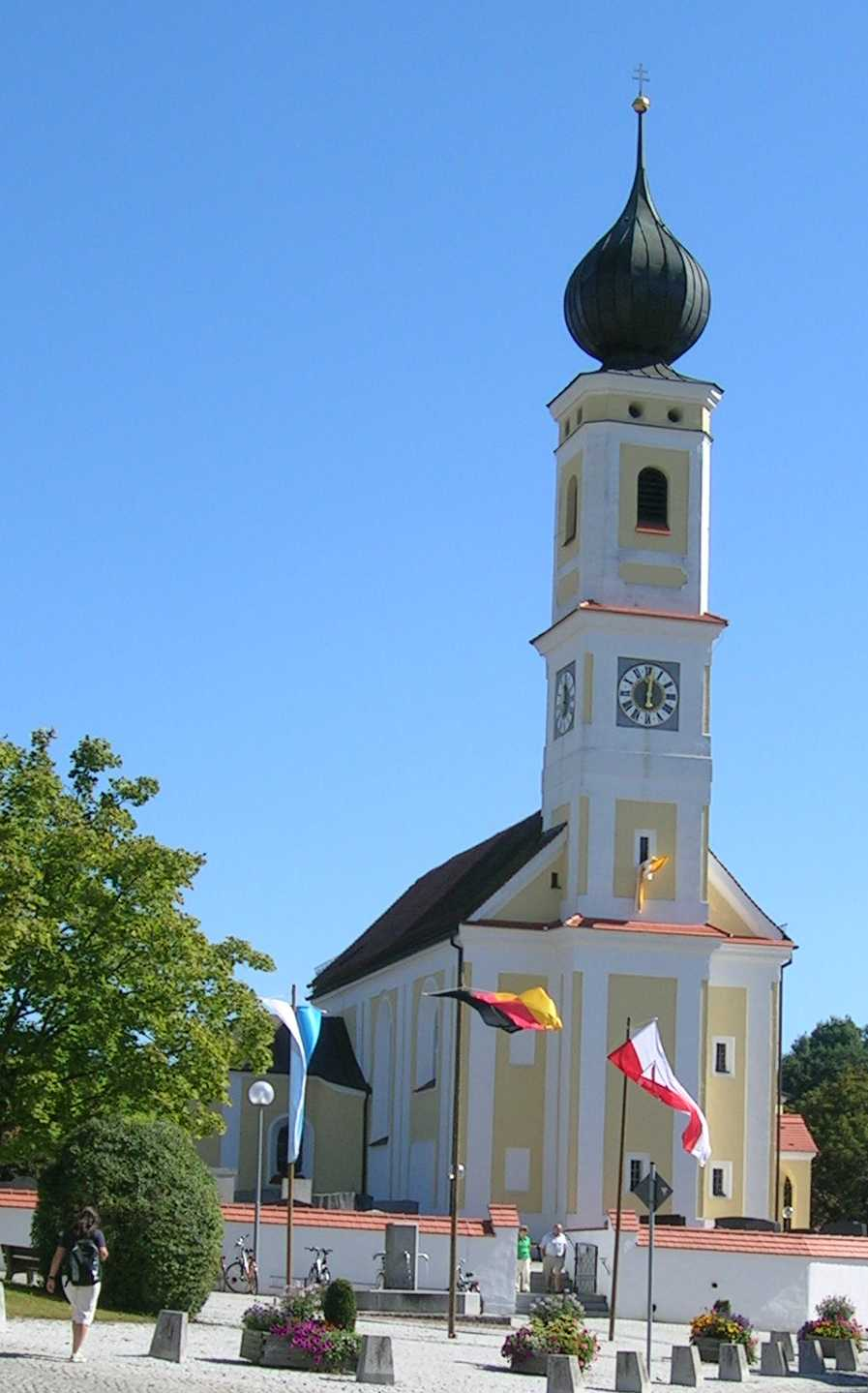
Parish church Hörgertshausen

=== Sights ===
- Parish church St. Jacob the Elder, Hörgertshausen, crayoned by Christian Winck and varnished by Roman Anton Boos in 1790/1791
- Parish church St. Margareth, Margarethenried
- Pilgrimage Church St. Alban
- Church St. Stephan, Sielstetten
- Chapel Mary solace, Doidorf
- „Albiganer Markt“ an annual small market and fair at Sankt Alban
- Town hall Hörgertshausen, distinguished with the Holzbaupreis 2007

=== Museum ===
- Museum of local history Margarethenried-Hörgertshausen

== Economy and infrastructure ==
Farming and especially the cultivation of hops is the main appearance of the commune. But there are also a lot of medium-sized enterprises and the German head office of the Italian GSI Group, which is a leading company in plastics technology and is supplying for e.g. Volkswagen and AGCO.

=== Mass transit ===
Hörgertshausen can be reached a couple of times a day with the bus line 683 from Moosburg and Mainburg

== Culture ==
Hörgertshausen is famous for its marching band which is leading the Riflemen at the annual Costume and Riflemen's Procession on the first Sunday in Munichs Oktoberfest.

== Education ==
- Elementary School Hörgertshausen

== Notable people ==
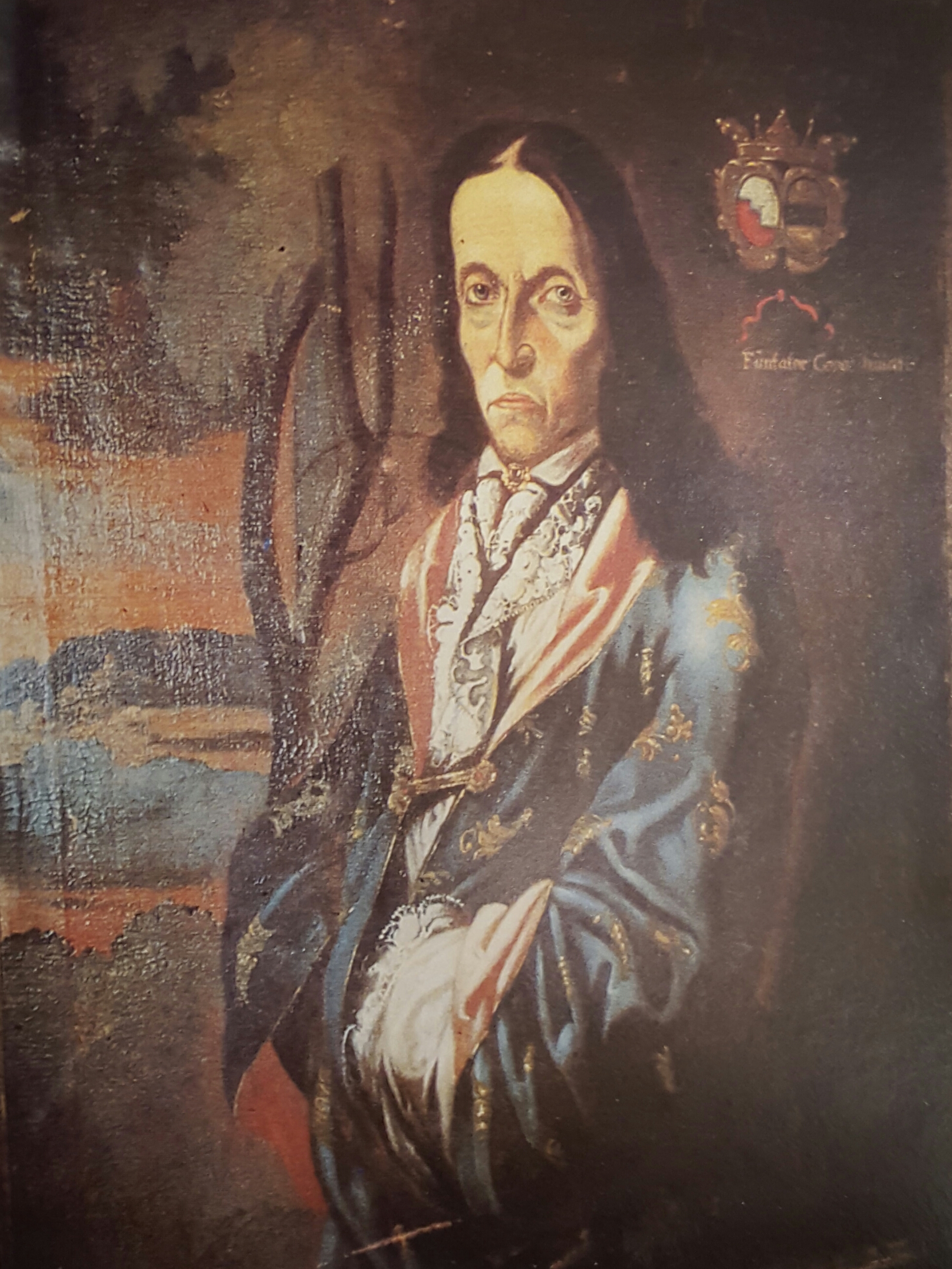
Johann Georg, Earl of Seiboldsdorf

- Johann Georg Graf von Seiboldsdorf (1628–1699), privy councillor, treasurer and governor of Lower Bavaria
- Prof. Dr. Philipp Fischer (* 1. Mai 1744; † 1. August 1800 in Ingolstadt), university professor at the University of Ingolstadt, medical attendant of Maximilian III Joseph, Elector of Bavaria, member of the Medical Society of Edinburgh (1776)
- Daniela Pichlmaier, Hallertauer Queen of hops 2001/02

=== Honorary mayor ===
- Lorenz Fischer, mayor of Hörgertshausen 1912–1937 (1937)

=== Honorary citizens ===
- Anton Eichner, priest of congregation 1929–1952 (1950)
- Erich Soika, priest of congregation 1960–1985 (1980)
