= Mauern (Verwaltungsgemeinschaft) =

- Verwaltungsgemeinschaft
- Location of Mauern within Freising district
- Interactive map of Mauern
- Location within Germany Location within Bavaria
- Coordinates: 48°31′N 11°54′E
- Country: Germany
- State: Bavaria
- Admin. region: Upper Bavaria
- District: Freising
- Seat: Mauern
- Subdivisions: 4 municipalities

Area
  - Total: 98.43 km^{2} (38.00 sq mi)

Population (2025-12-31)
  - Total: 9,233
  - Density: 93.80/km^{2} (242.9/sq mi)
- Time zone: UTC+01:00 (CET)
  - Summer (DST): UTC+02:00 (CEST)
- Website: www.vg-mauern.de

Mauern is a Verwaltungsgemeinschaft (municipal association) in the district of Freising in Bavaria, Germany. Its seat is in Mauern.

It consists of the following municipalities:

1. Gammelsdorf
2. Hörgertshausen
3. Mauern
4. Wang
