= Roman Anton Boos =

German sculptor (c.1733–1810)

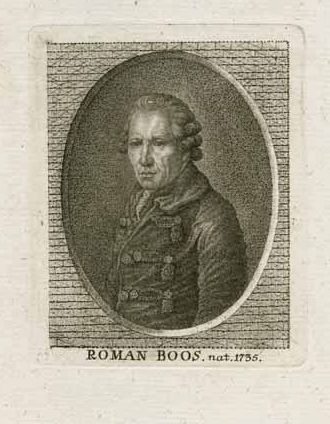
Roman Anton Boos, from the Bavarian State Library (anonymous, date unknown)

Roman Anton Boos (28 February 1733 (?) in Bischofswang, near Roßhaupten - 19 December 1810, Munich) was a German sculptor.

== Biography ==
He was born into a family of farmers. Despite being unlettered, his father recognized his son's talent and obtained an apprenticeship for him with the sculptor Anton Sturm. It is unclear if he remained there until Sturm's death in 1757, but the year 1760 found him in the workshop of Johann Baptist Straub in Munich, where he stayed intermittently until 1769. He also attended classes at the Academy of Fine Arts Vienna, and completed his studies at the Municipal Academy in Augsburg.

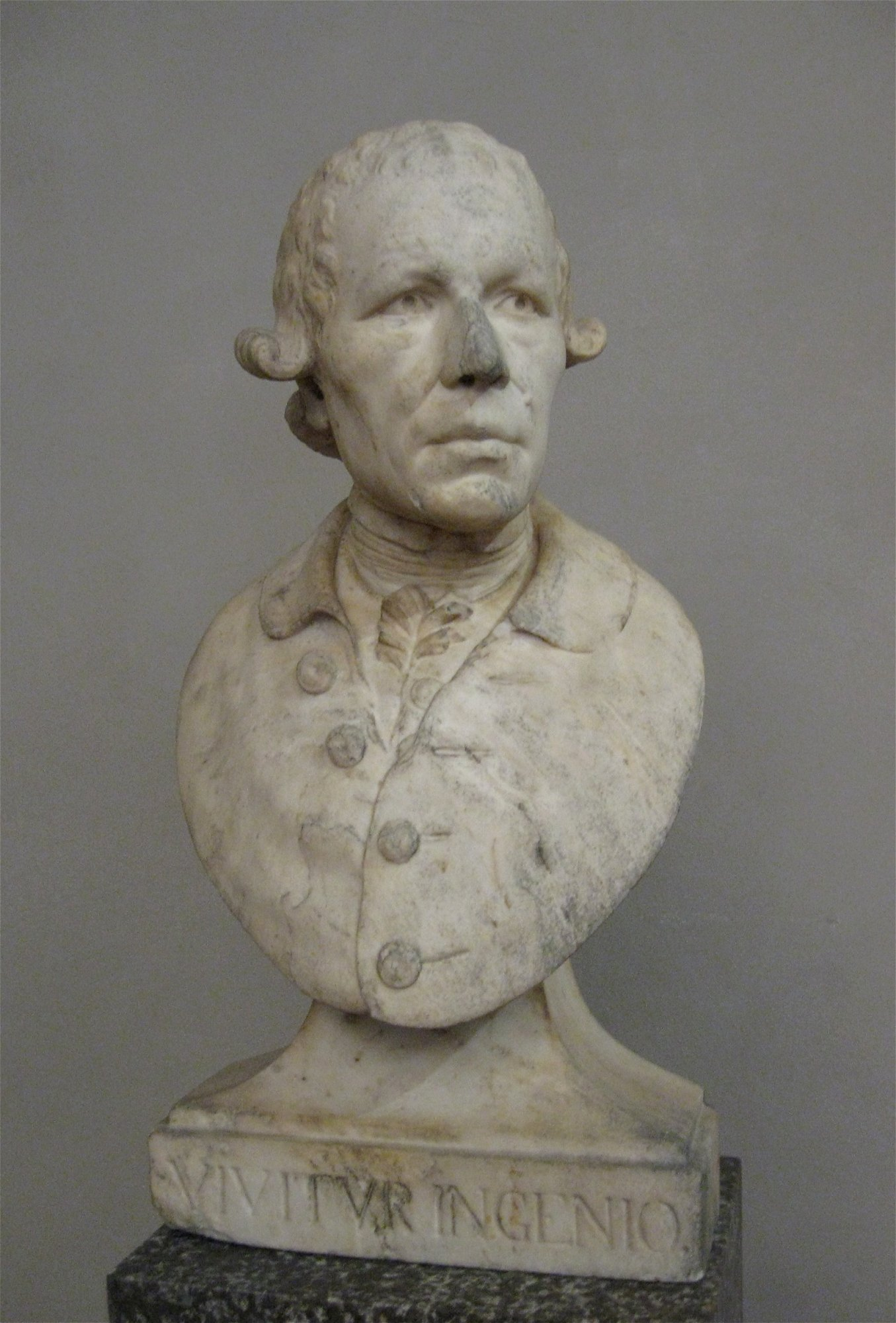
Self-portrait bust (1790), intended for his grave: now in the Bayerisches Nationalmuseum

In 1769, he returned to Munich and completed his first known commission; figures of Ludwig der Strenge and Ludwig der Bayer for Fürstenfeld Abbey. The following year saw the establishment of a private drawing school under the aegis of Elector Maximilian III. Together with the school's other founders, Franz Ignaz Oefele and Franz Xaver Feuchtmayer, he hoped to free Bavaria from its dependence on foreign schools and art teachers. He would later become a Professor at the Munich Art Academy.

For the next fifteen years, he was primarily employed by the Electoral Court, securing a position as the official Court Sculptor in 1774, at a salary of 300 Florins. His first assignment was a figure of Amphitrite, one of several to be placed in the Nymphenburg Palace Gardens but, due to conflicting commitments (and a death) involving the other sculptors, he actually provided nine statues; a project which occupied him until 1785. During this time (in 1777) he married the daughter of his former teacher, Straub, and moved in with the family. From 1788 to 1798, he created a dozen vases with mythological scenes to set up between the statues and executed several commissions for sacred works at a number of churches.

=== Career in decline ===
However, his church sculptures didn't bring him the anticipated public commissions and he began to suffer financially, turning to smaller works (grave memorials and the like) to make ends meet. Several proposals to restore and improve statuary belonging to the government were rejected. Eventually (in 1802), a fund was established whereby Johann Christian von Mannlich, Director of the Alte Pinakothek, could employ Boos to do work at selected public parks or government buildings, but the sum allotted was too low and he ended by cleaning and repairing statues that he had created at the Nymphenburg Palace twenty years before.

In 1805, he failed to be chosen for a project involving large figures for two fountains at the former Capuchin burial grounds, effectively ending his career. More disgrace was to follow. In 1806, he was replaced as head of the sculpture class at the Academy. When the new Royal Academy of Fine Arts was established in 1808, his participation was not even sought. It is probably not a coincidence that his troubles began shortly after the death of Elector Karl Theodor, who was notorious for being more interested in art and philosophy than politics, but there seems to be no reason why his successor, Maximilian Joseph would have had any grievances against Boos.

He died in 1810 and is interred in a tomb with his wife Theresa Amalia (who died in 1816) at the Alter Südfriedhof.

== Selected major works ==
- 1767–1768: Four statues of saints for the façade of the Theatine Church, Munich.
- 1770: Figure of John of Nepomuk, for the fountain in front of the Jesuit College. In 1804, the fountain was demolished and the statue moved to the Mariahilfplatz. It was destroyed in 1944.
- 1775-1785: Statues in the Nymphenburg Palace Gardens: Amphitrite (1775), after a design by Charles de Grof (1712-1774). Mars and Pallas Athene (1777), after plaster models by Ignaz Günther. Mercury and Venus (1780). Bacchus and Ceres (1782). Apollo and Diana (1785).
- 1779–1781: Eight figure groups representing the Labors of Hercules in the northern niche of the Hofgarten Arcade; after paintings by Peter Candid.
- 1786–1798: Twelve decorative marble vases on mythological themes for the Nymphenburg Palace Gardens.
- 1790: Larger than life Crucifix for the pilgrimage church in Wemding.
- 1791: Crucifix and pulpit for the parish church in Hörgertshausen.
- 1796: Figures of the Four Evangelists for the parish church of St. Phillip and Jakob in Altötting.

== Statues from the Nymphenburg Palace Gardens ==
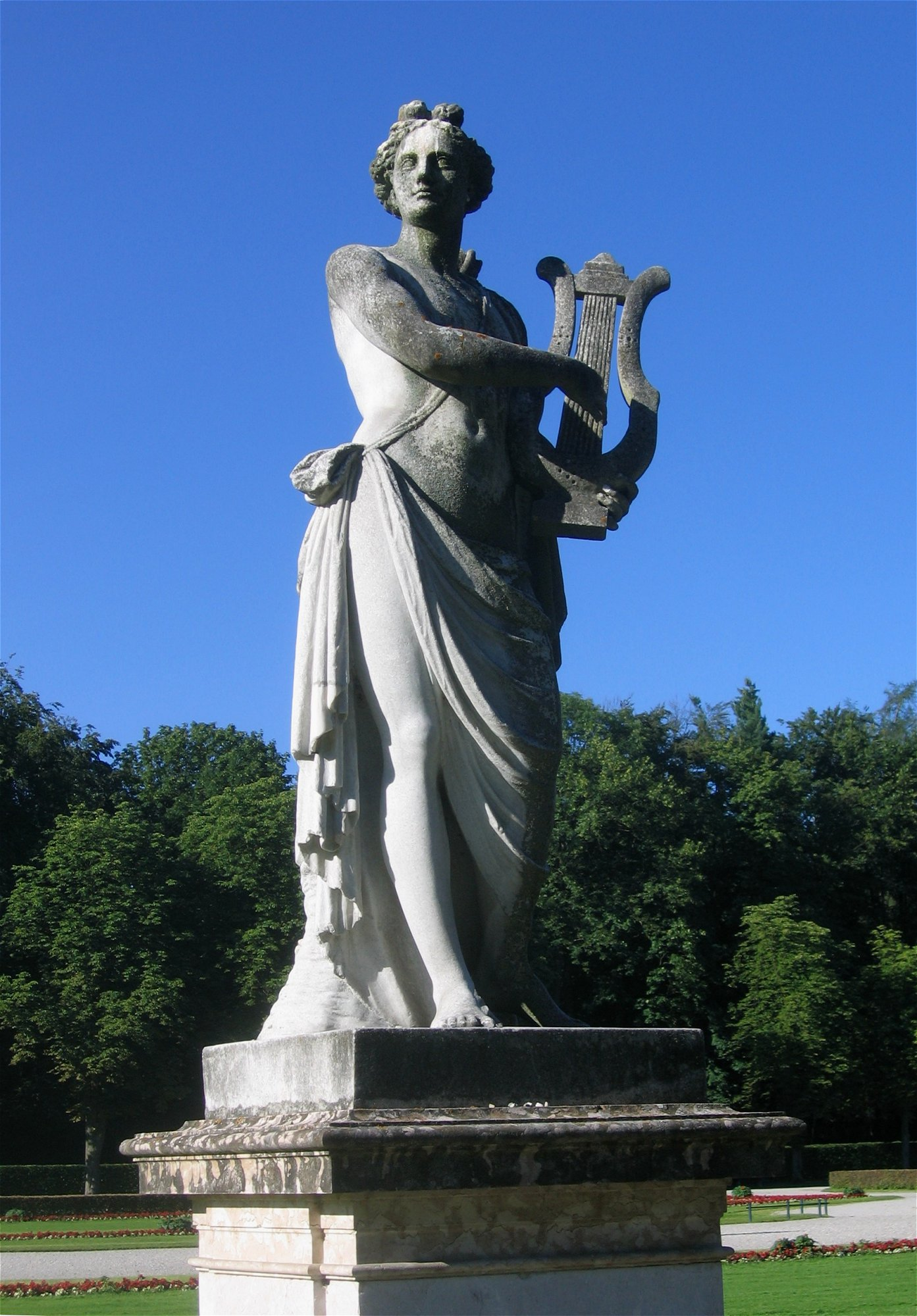
Apollo

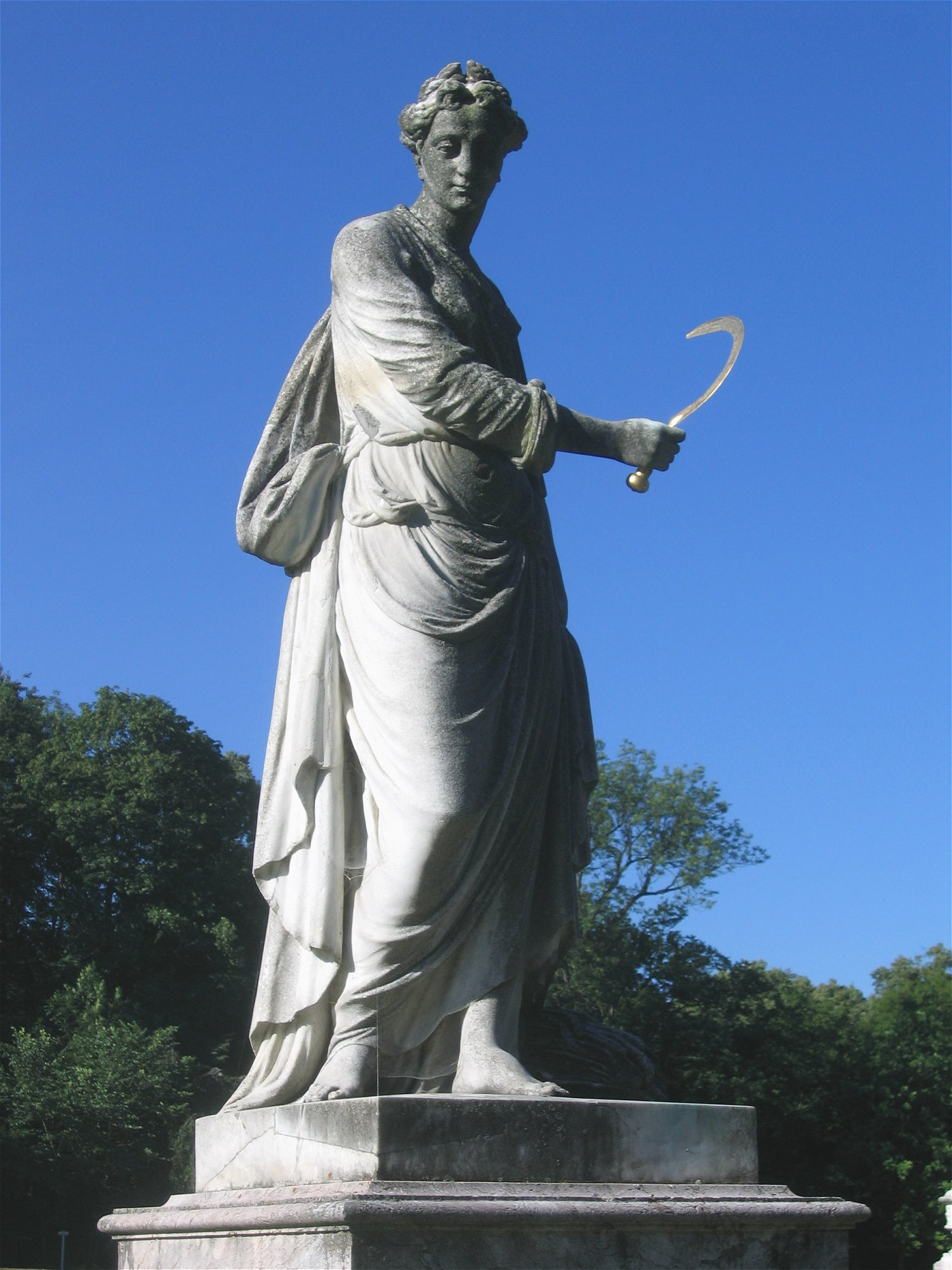
Ceres

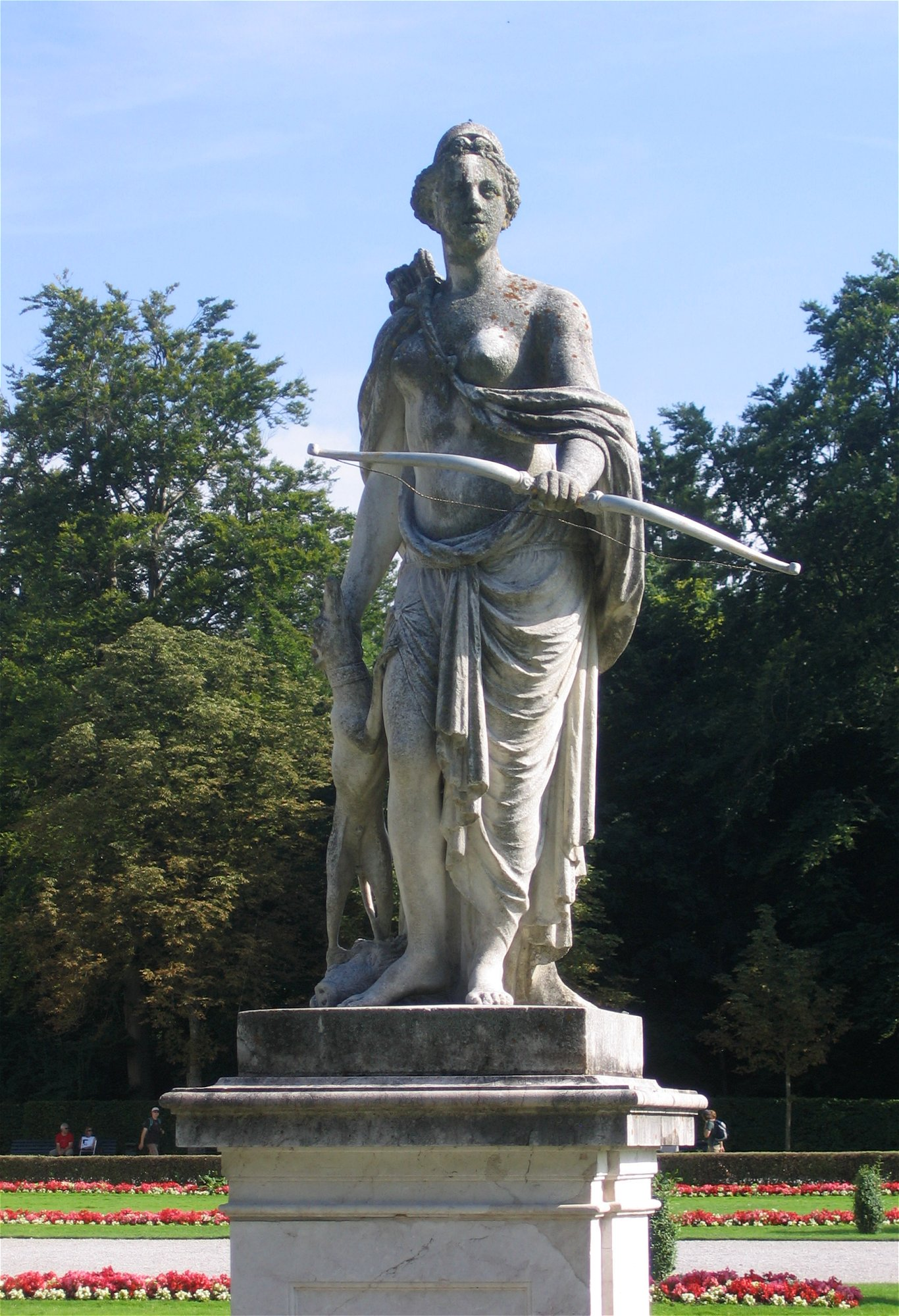
Diana

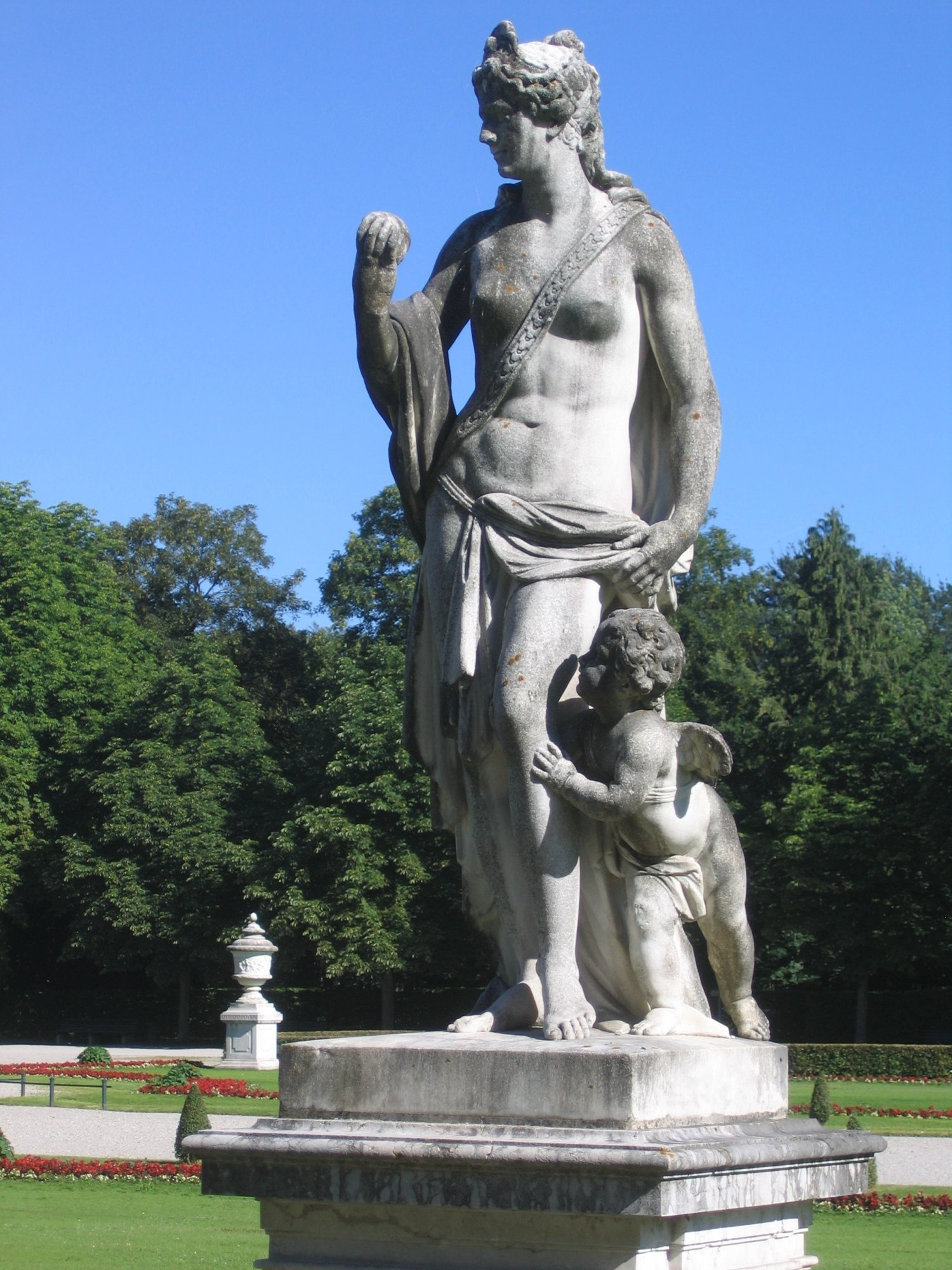
Venus

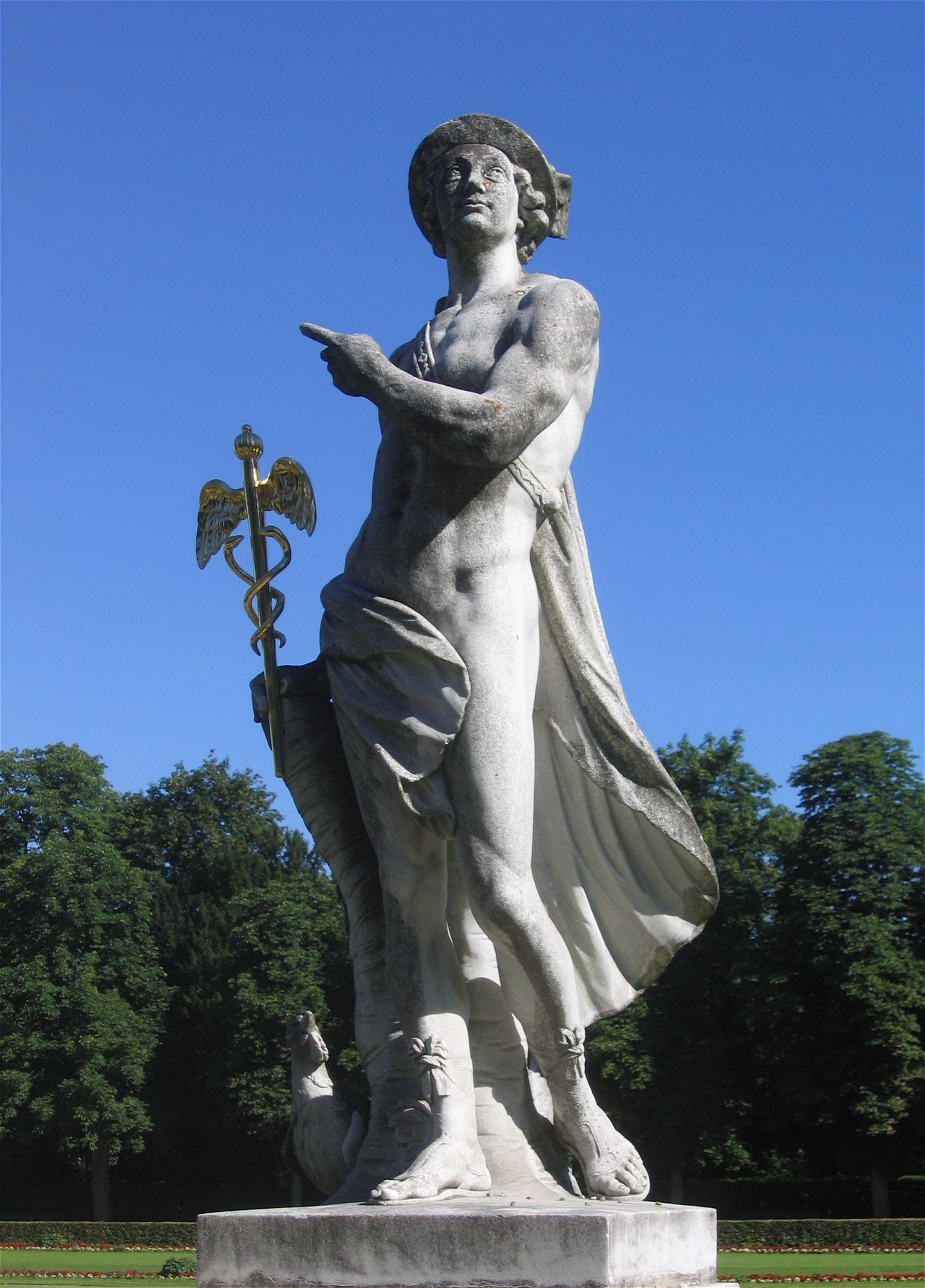
Mercury
