= Jörg von Halsbach =

German bricklayer and architect

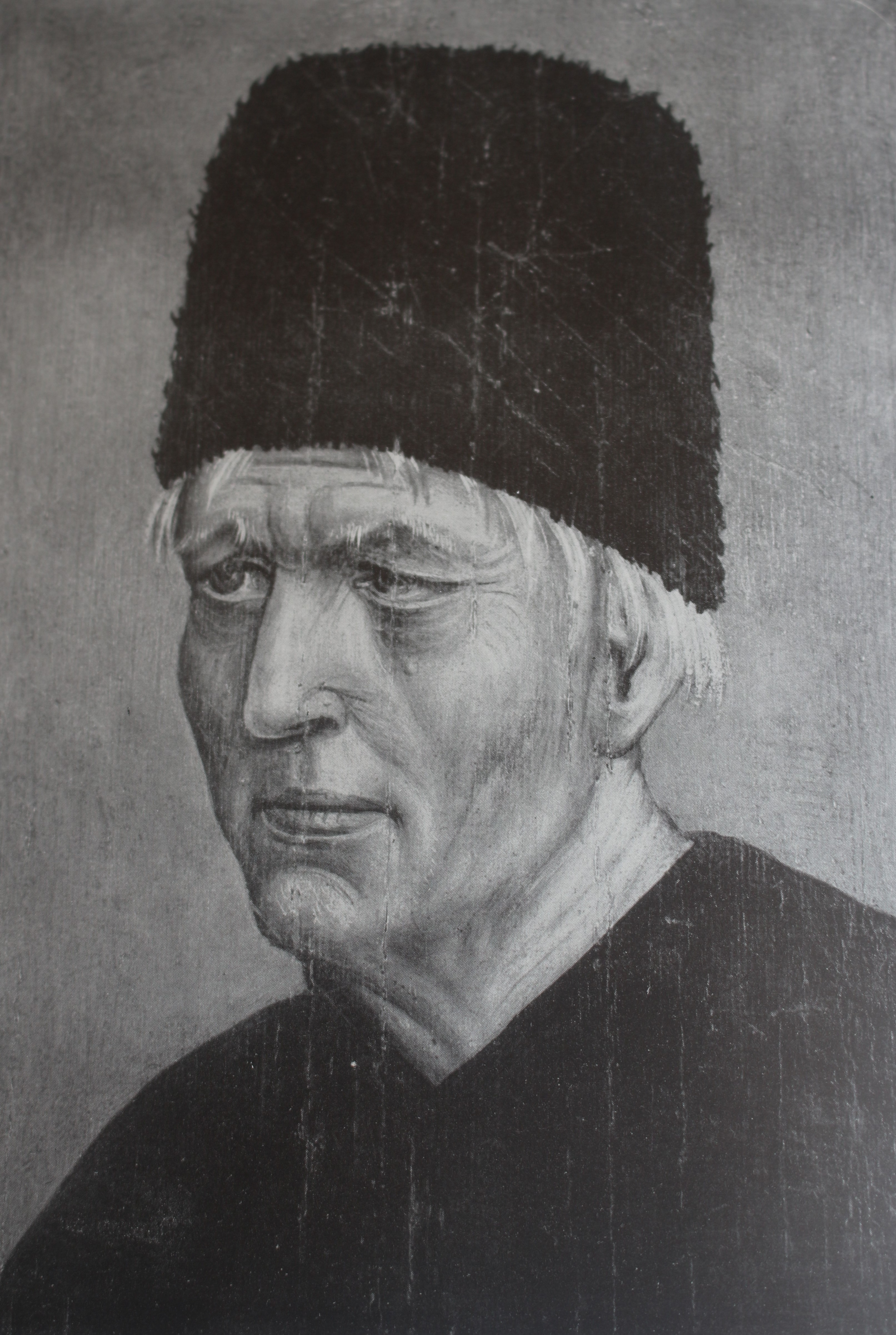
Portrait by Jan Polack Kreuzkirche in Munich

Jörg von Halsbach (d. 6 October 1488), also called Halspach or Ganghofer was a German bricklayer and architect. He was from Polling and worked in Munich and Freising.

== Biography ==
Jörg von Halsbach was educated probably in Braunau or Wasserburg am Inn, where a strong tradition of late Gothic architecture had prevailed. In 1441 he was detected for the first time during reconstruction work on the choir of the monastery church in Ettal. He was also involved in the 1450 completed parish in Polling. Between 1479 and 1484 he was consulted to build the tower of the church in Hall in Tirol.

Jörg von Halsbach is most known as architect of the Frauenkirche in Munich (1468–1488). The large church was constructed from red brick within only 20 years. Already in 1470 Halsbach began to re-design the Old Town Hall in Munich in late-Gothic style, in 1478 he started to build the Munich Kreuzkirche.

He also worked for the Bishops of Freising. Jörg von Halsbach's grave is situated in the chapel of the northern tower of the Frauenkirche.

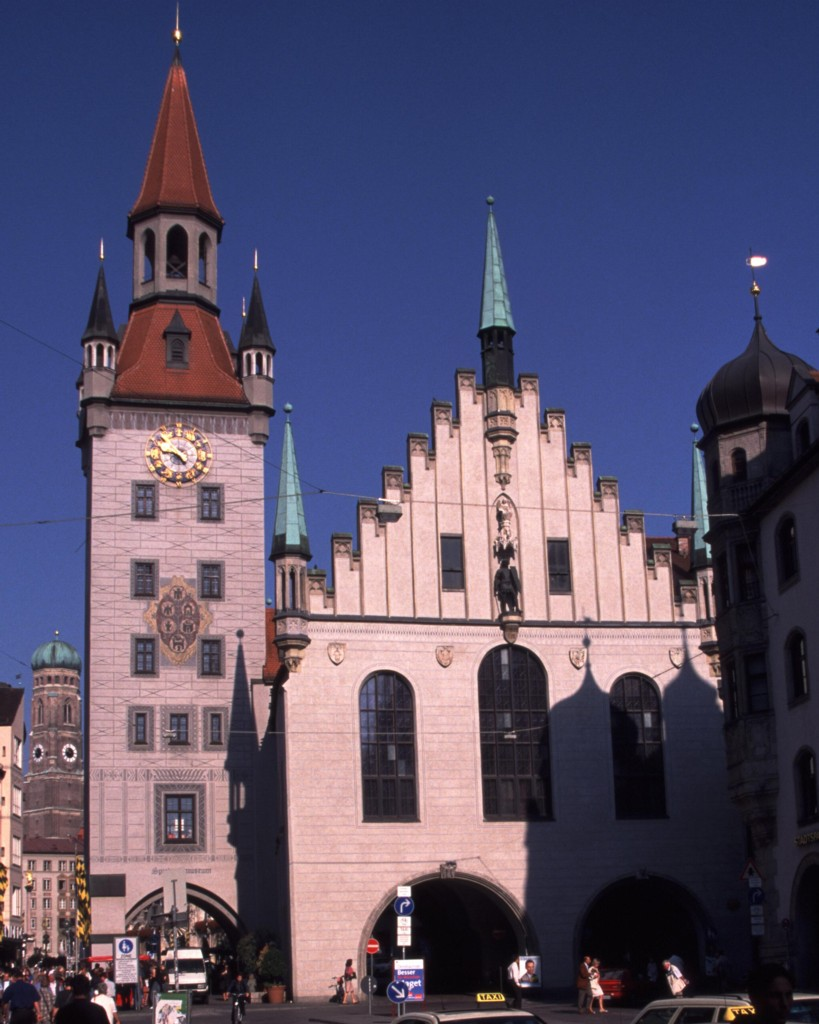
Old Town Hall in Munich (with the Southern Tower of the Frauenkirche in the background)
