= Kreuzkirche, Munich =

Filial church in Munich, Germany

Coordinates: 48°08′8″N 11°34′5″E

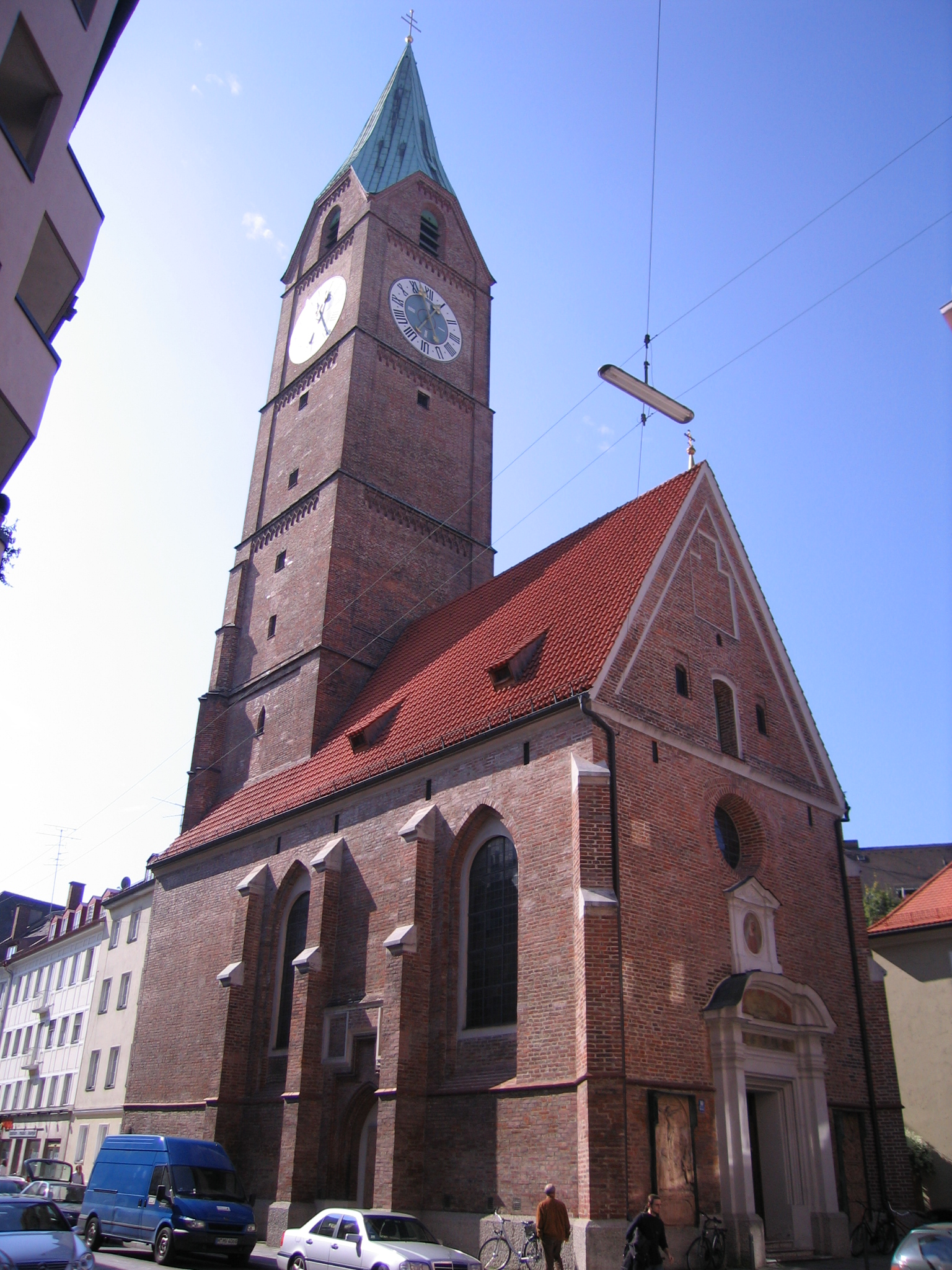
All Saints Catholic Church on the cross

The Church of All Saints (German: Allerheiligenkirche) also known as Holy Cross Church (German: Kreuzkirche), is a cemetery church in Munich, southern Germany. The church is currently operated by the Priestly Fraternity of Saint Peter.

The church was built in 1478 by Jörg von Halsbach and was the first church with a cemetery in the St. Peter parish. It was once located at the crossing of four roads, whence the original suffix am Kreuz ("at the Cross").

It has unadorned brickwork walls, Gothicvaults and a tall bell tower. The interior was rebuilt from 1620 in Baroque style, the only remaining Gothic elements being the nave's vault, fragments of a fresco and a Crucifix by Hans Leinberger. The tomb of banker Gietz and the Apparition of the Virgin to St. Augustine (by Hans Rottenhammer) are in Mannerist style.
