= Peter Candid =

Flemish-born Mannerist painter

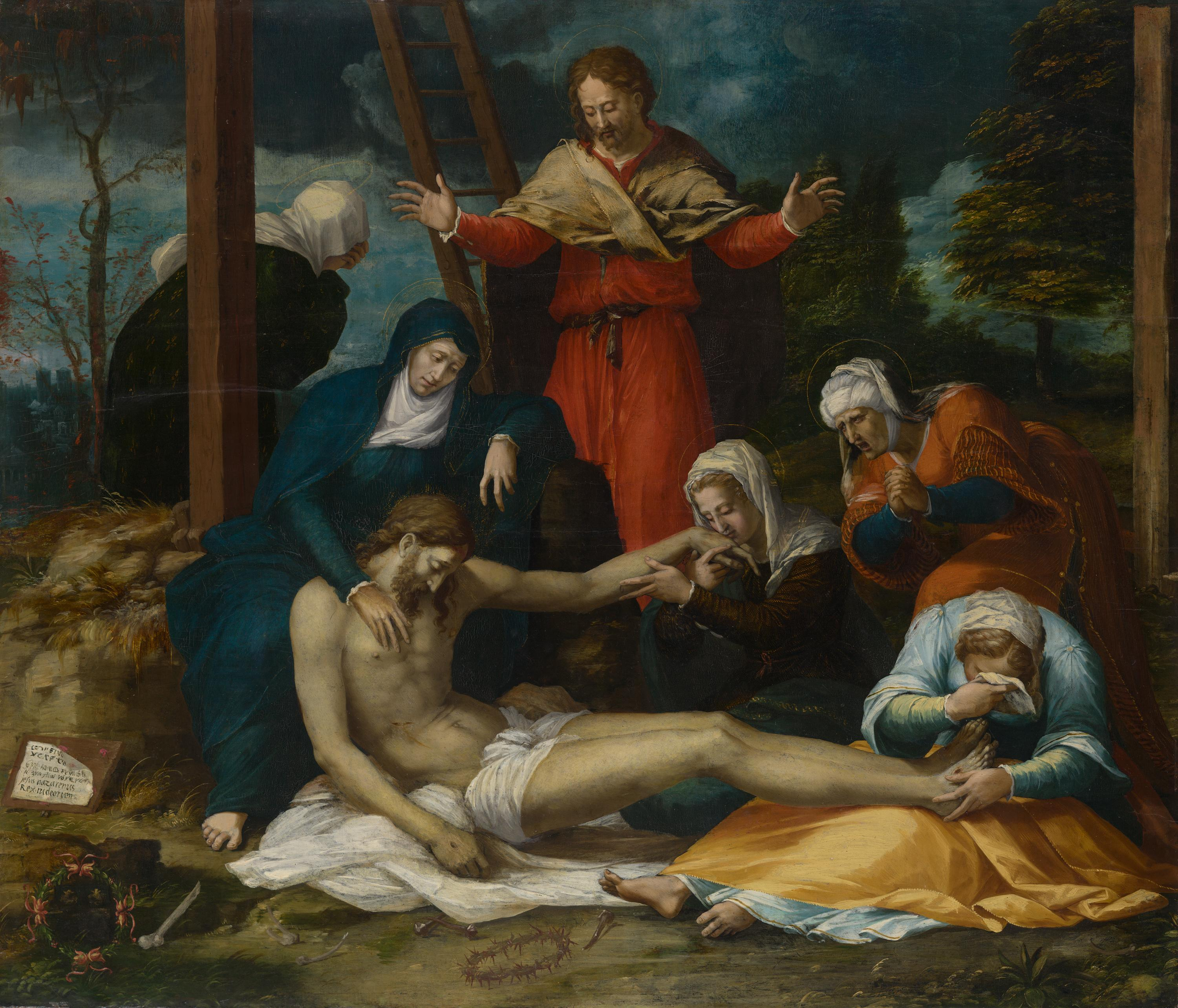
Lamentation over the Dead Christ

Peter de Witte, known in Italy as Pietro Candido and in Bavaria as Peter Candid (c. 1548 – 1628) was a Flemish-born Mannerist painter, tapestry designer and draughtsman active in Italy and Bavaria. He was an artist at the Medici court in Florence and at the Bavarian court of Duke William V and his successor Maximilian I in Munich.

== Life ==
Candid was born in Bruges and moved with his parents to Florence at the age of 10. His father Elias was a tapestry weaver who had been hired by the newly opened Medici weaving workshop, the Arazzeria Medicea, which was led by the Flemish master Jan Rost. The original Flemish family name was 'de Witte'. The word 'witte' means 'white' in Flemish and that is why the family adopted the Italian family name' Candido' in Italy, an Italian word which also means 'white'. Peter would change his family name to 'Candid' after he moved to Germany.

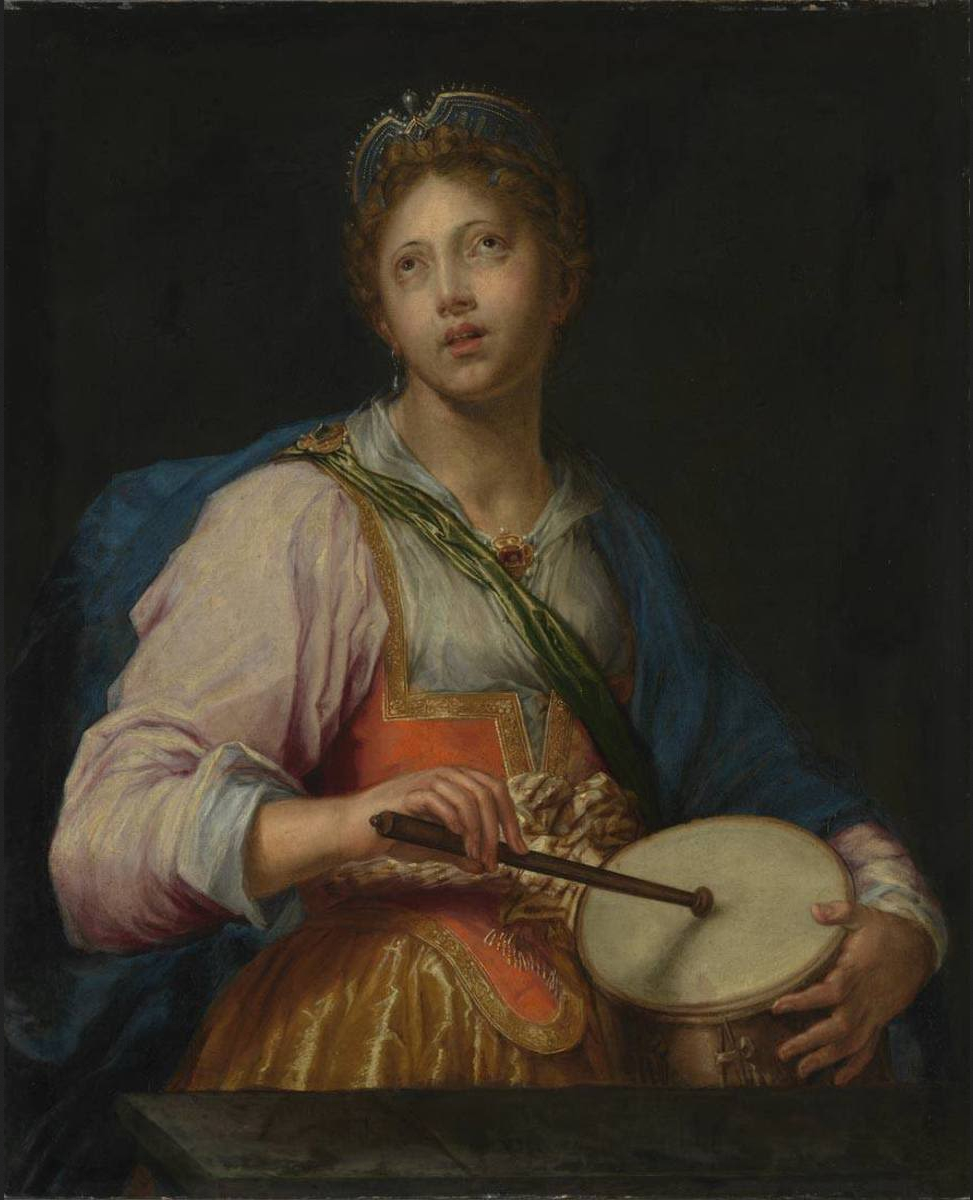
The daughter of Jephta

Peter started his apprenticeship in Italy in the early 1560s under an unknown master. The earliest known record of Candid's work as an artist is in relation to payment for a fresco made in Florence in 1569. He is first mentioned as a member of the 'Accademia delle Arti del Disegno' in 1576. The Accademia delle Arti del Disegno was a prestigious academy of artists in Florence whose members have included Michelangelo Buonarroti, Lazzaro Donati, Agnolo Bronzino, Benvenuto Cellini and others. Beginning in 1578 he painted a series of three altarpieces for churches in Volterra, including an Adoration of the Shepherds (1580) and a Lamentation over the Dead Christ (1585–86, Pinacoteca Civica). The 16th century Flemish biographer Karel van Mander who knew Candid when he visited Italy, recounted that Candid worked with Giorgio Vasari on the Sala Regia in the Vatican and on the cupola of the Florence Cathedral. After working in Rome at the Sala Regia in the years 1582 and 1583, he returned to Florence.

By 1586 he was called to the Ducal court of Munich upon the recommendation of the sculptor Giambologna, another Flemish artist working in Italy with whom Candid was closely associated. He was first court painter to Duke William V of Bavaria and later Maximilian I of Bavaria. For the Duke and Elector Maximilian, Candid worked on several fresco cycles in numerous buildings, including the Antiquarium and the State Rooms of the ducal palace Munich Residenz and the State Room in the Schleissheim Palace and made the designs for the ceilings of the Goldener Saal in the Augsburg Town Hall. In the period 1600 to 1628 he was the leading artist in Munich. He was also active as an art dealer and had business dealings with Philipp Hainhofer, a merchant, banker, diplomat and art collector in Augsburg remembered, among other things, for his curiosity cabinets.

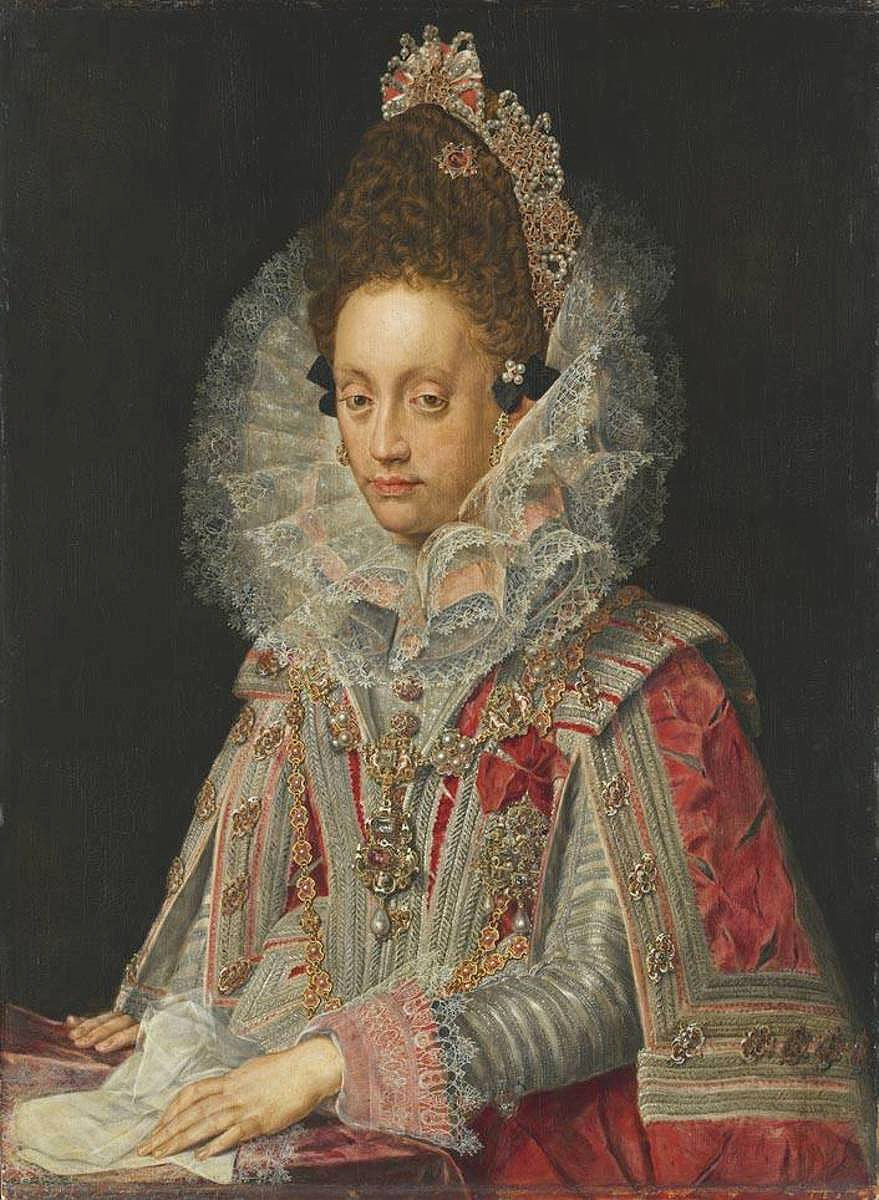
Portrait of Duchess Magdalena of Bavaria

He married and had five children, including a son Wilhelm (fl 1613–1625), who was a painter but after 1625 became a court official. His daughter married the engraver Filips Sadeler in 1624.

He was the teacher of Johann Ulrich Loth. He died in Munich.

== Work ==
=== General ===
Peter Candid was an extremely versatile artist who was not only a painter but also a designer of tapestries, prints and sculptures. His pictorial work ranges from history paintings, portraits, mythological scenes and allegories. He created large altarpieces as well as complex decorative projects. He was an oil painter as well as a fresco artist. He is credited with introducing Italian fresco painting as a preferred medium in Bavaria. The iconography, which he developed, exerted an influence well into the 18th century.

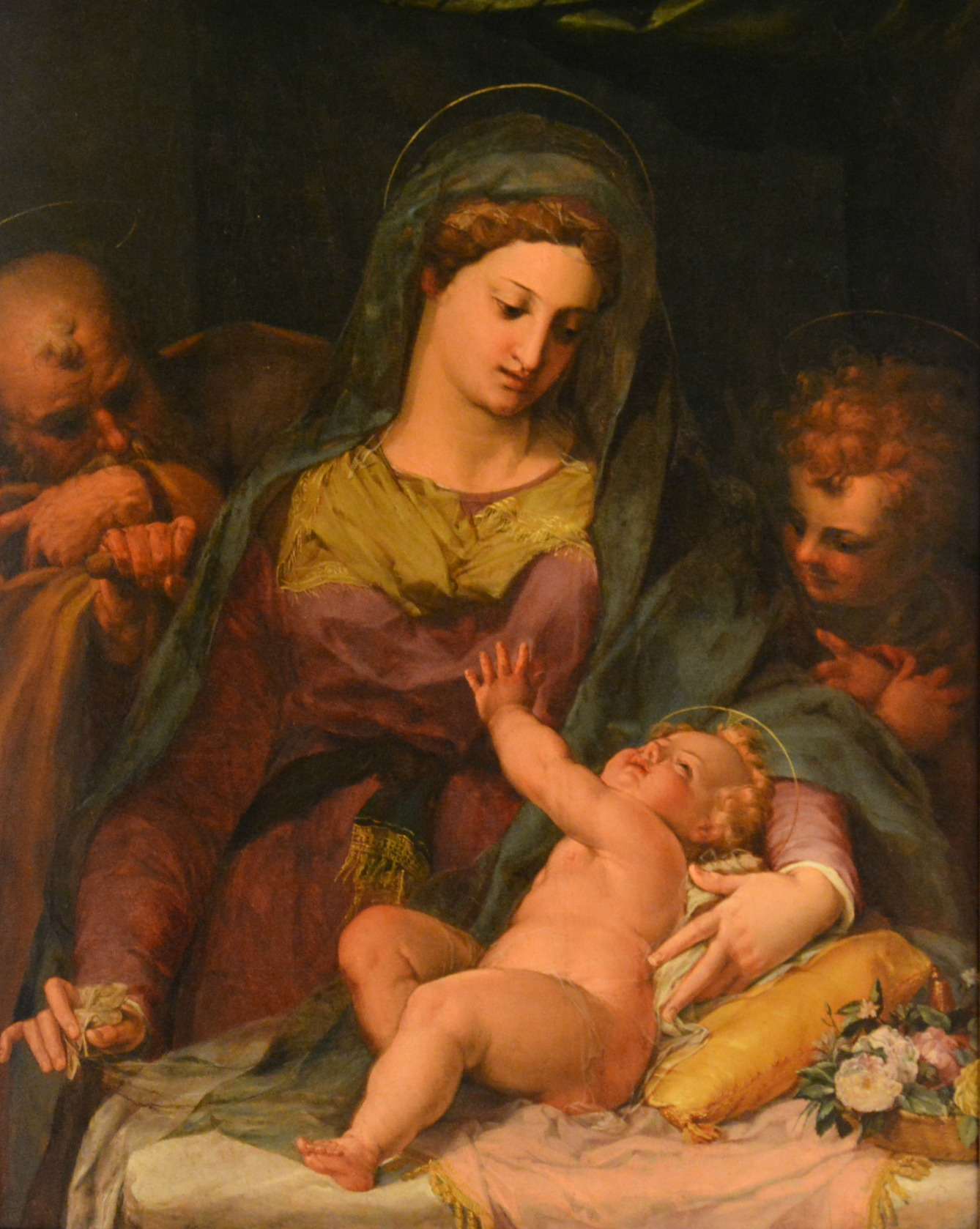
The Holy Family with St. John

He completed many frescos and oil paintings in Italy and also made tapestry designs and other works for Cosimo I de' Medici, Grand Duke of Tuscany. His style in Florence was influenced by the school of Michelangelo, although he was closer to Bronzino and Alessandro Allori than to Vasari. His work also shows the influence of the Flemish tradition.

In Munich he initially worked as part of a team of Italian artists under the direction of the Dutch-Italian painter Friedrich Sustris, who had also been in Florence. He realised frescoes after Sustris' designs for the court. He also produced many altarpieces. He became more autonomous after Sustris died and Maximilian I of Bavaria had ascended the throne at the end of the century. Candid further was responsible for all interior paintings at the new buildings added by Duke Maximilian to his palaces and continued to realise altar pieces. He executed small paintings on copper panels on religious, mythological and allegorical themes in a Mannerist style.

In his later works he worked in a style transitory from the Late Renaissance to the early Baroque. This is evident in the Assumption of Mary, the altarpiece for the Munich Frauenkirche completed in 1620.

=== Tapestry designer ===
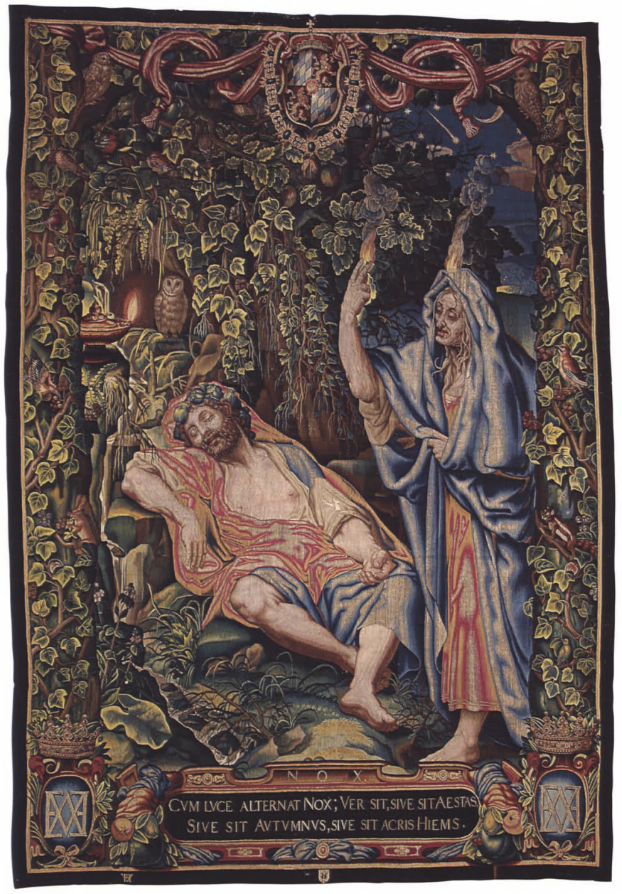
Night

Peter Candid was an important designer for the weaving workshop which had been set up by Duke Maximilian. It was managed by the Flemish master weaver Hans van der Biest. Van der Biest had been invited from Flanders by the Duke to set up a tapestry workshop with craftsmen from the Low Countries in 1604. He was given a large stipend and funds to visit the Southern Netherlands to source materials and recruit weaving professionals. The tapestries to be produced were principally intended to decorate the Munich Residenz, the royal palace of the Duke in Munich. Despite its modest size of about 20 weavers the workshop produced tapestries of an excellent quality with vibrant colours, dynamic scenes and entertaining details. The workshop stayed in operation until 1615.

Candid created cartons for this workshop. From these were woven three series of tapestries made up of about 50 hangings worked through with gold. The tapestries were a set of 12 Grotesques, 11 scenes from the Story of Otto von Wittelsbach, the founder of the House of Wittelsbach, and 18 tapestries depicting The Months, The Seasons and Day and Night. He also designed but did not make the cartons for a series of 12 tapestries depicting biblical and mythological scenes. The cartons were preserved and were used about 100 years later by the engraver Carl Gustav Amling for a series of prints. Candid personally intervened in the weaving of the tapestries and visited the workshop to give the weavers guidance. The tapestries woven in Munich from Candid's designs were among the finest and most innovative products of the early seventeenth-century European tapestry industry.
