= Mauern =

- Municipality
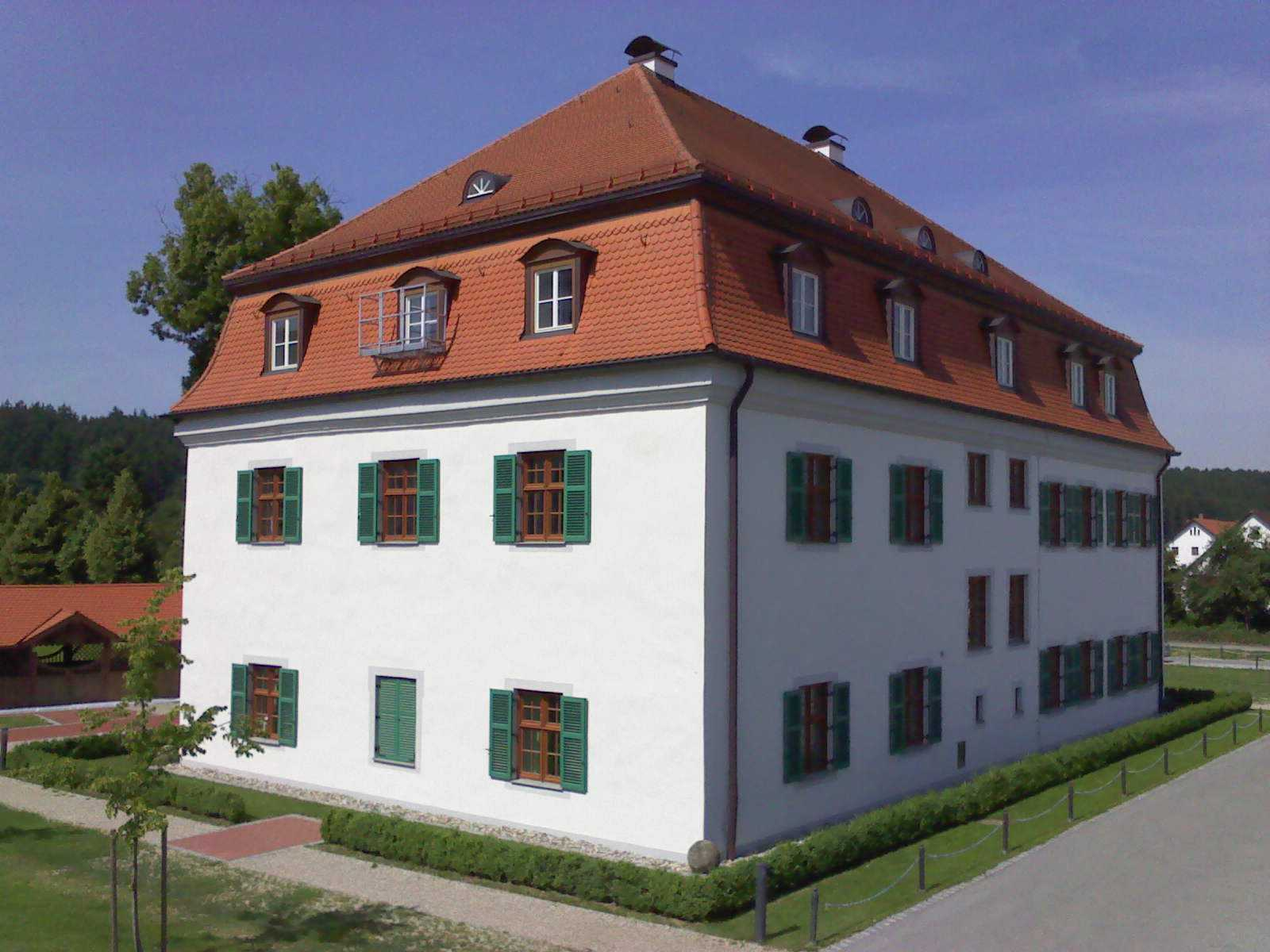
- Castle in Mauern

- Coat of arms

- Location of Mauern within Freising district
- Interactive map of Mauern
- Location within Germany Location within Bavaria
- Coordinates: 48°31′N 11°54′E
- Country: Germany
- State: Bavaria
- Admin. region: Oberbayern
- District: Freising
- Municipal assoc.: Mauern

Government
  - Mayor (2020–26): Georg Krojer (FW)

Area
  - Total: 24.15 km^{2} (9.32 sq mi)
- Elevation: 435 m (1,427 ft)

Population (2025-12-31)
  - Total: 3,158
  - Density: 130.8/km^{2} (338.7/sq mi)
- Time zone: UTC+01:00 (CET)
  - Summer (DST): UTC+02:00 (CEST)
- Postal codes: 85419
- Dialling codes: 08764
- Vehicle registration: FS
- Website: www.gemeinde-mauern.de

Mauern (German pronunciation: [ˈmaʊɐn]) is a municipality in the district of Freising in Bavaria in Germany.
