= Wang, Bavaria =

Wang
- Municipality
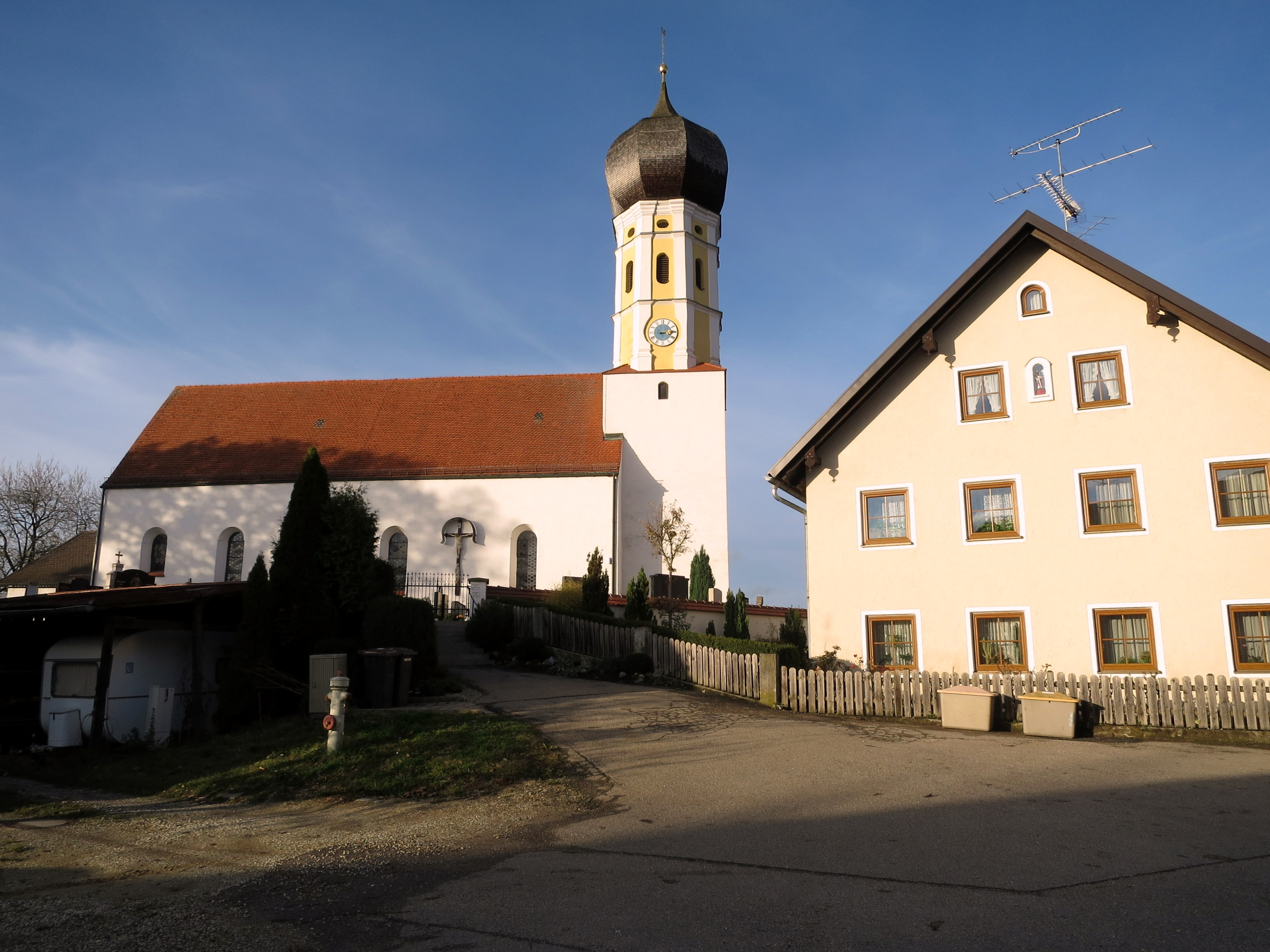
- Church of Saint Martin

- Coat of arms

- Location of Wang within Freising district
- Interactive map of Wang
- Location within Germany Location within Bavaria
- Coordinates: 48°30′N 11°57′E
- Country: Germany
- State: Bavaria
- Admin. region: Oberbayern
- District: Freising
- Municipal assoc.: Mauern

Government
  - Mayor (2020–26): Markus Stöber

Area
  - Total: 31.18 km^{2} (12.04 sq mi)
- Elevation: 415 m (1,362 ft)

Population (2025-12-31)
  - Total: 2,507
  - Density: 80.40/km^{2} (208.2/sq mi)
- Time zone: UTC+01:00 (CET)
  - Summer (DST): UTC+02:00 (CEST)
- Postal codes: 85368
- Dialling codes: 08761 / 08764
- Vehicle registration: FS
- Website: www.wang-obb.de

Wang (German pronunciation: [vaŋ]) is a municipality in the district of Freising in Bavaria in Germany.

== Archaeology ==
Wang is home to a large Neolithic archaeological site with up to six phases of occupation. It was first excavated by Jens Lüning (de) in the 1980s where several intercutting periods came to pass. It is also one of the most southerly eras of the first Linear Pottery culture (LBK) horizon period when sedimentary ideas, although not necessarily new people, came to central Europe. Most famous for the longhouse, this area uncovered several belonging to the LBK.

The site was recently reopened by A.W.R Whittle and D. Hoffman in 2008, 50 meters south of the original excavation where another three longhouses were fully excavated and 3 more uncovered.
