= Gammelsdorf =

- Municipality
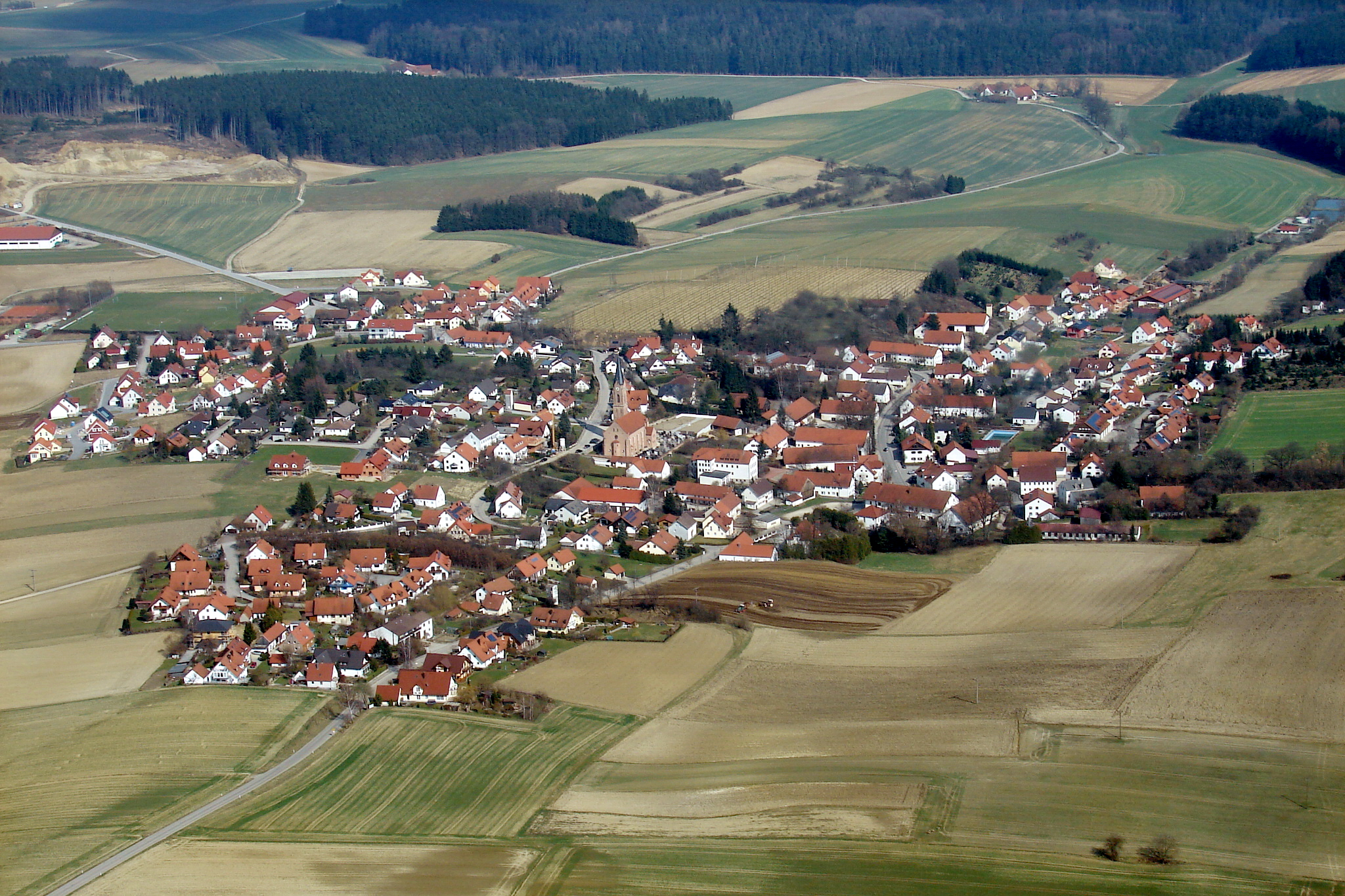
- Aerial view

- Coat of arms

- Location of Gammelsdorf within Freising district
- Interactive map of Gammelsdorf
- Location within Germany Location within Bavaria
- Coordinates: 48°33′N 11°57′E
- Country: Germany
- State: Bavaria
- Admin. region: Oberbayern
- District: Freising
- Municipal assoc.: Mauern

Government
  - Mayor (2020–26): Raimunda Menzel

Area
  - Total: 21.62 km^{2} (8.35 sq mi)
- Elevation: 495 m (1,624 ft)

Population (2025-12-31)
  - Total: 1,595
  - Density: 73.77/km^{2} (191.1/sq mi)
- Time zone: UTC+01:00 (CET)
  - Summer (DST): UTC+02:00 (CEST)
- Postal codes: 85408
- Dialling codes: 08766
- Vehicle registration: FS
- Website: https://www.vg-mauern.de/gammelsdorf/

Gammelsdorf (German pronunciation: [ˈɡaml̩sˌdɔʁf]) is a municipality in the district of Freising in Bavaria in Germany.

It was the site of the 1313 Battle of Gammelsdorf.

Until the mid-1990s Gammelsdorf was home of the "Circus", formerly known as the world's first village cinema, and later a nightclub where many famous artists and rock bands held concerts, most notably Nirvana.
