= List of cities in Bavaria by population =

The following list sorts all cities and municipalities in the German state of Bavaria with a population of more than 20,000. As of May 15, 2022, 75 places fulfill this criterion and are listed here. This list refers only to the population of individual municipalities within their defined limits, which does not include other municipalities or suburban areas within urban agglomerations.

== List ==
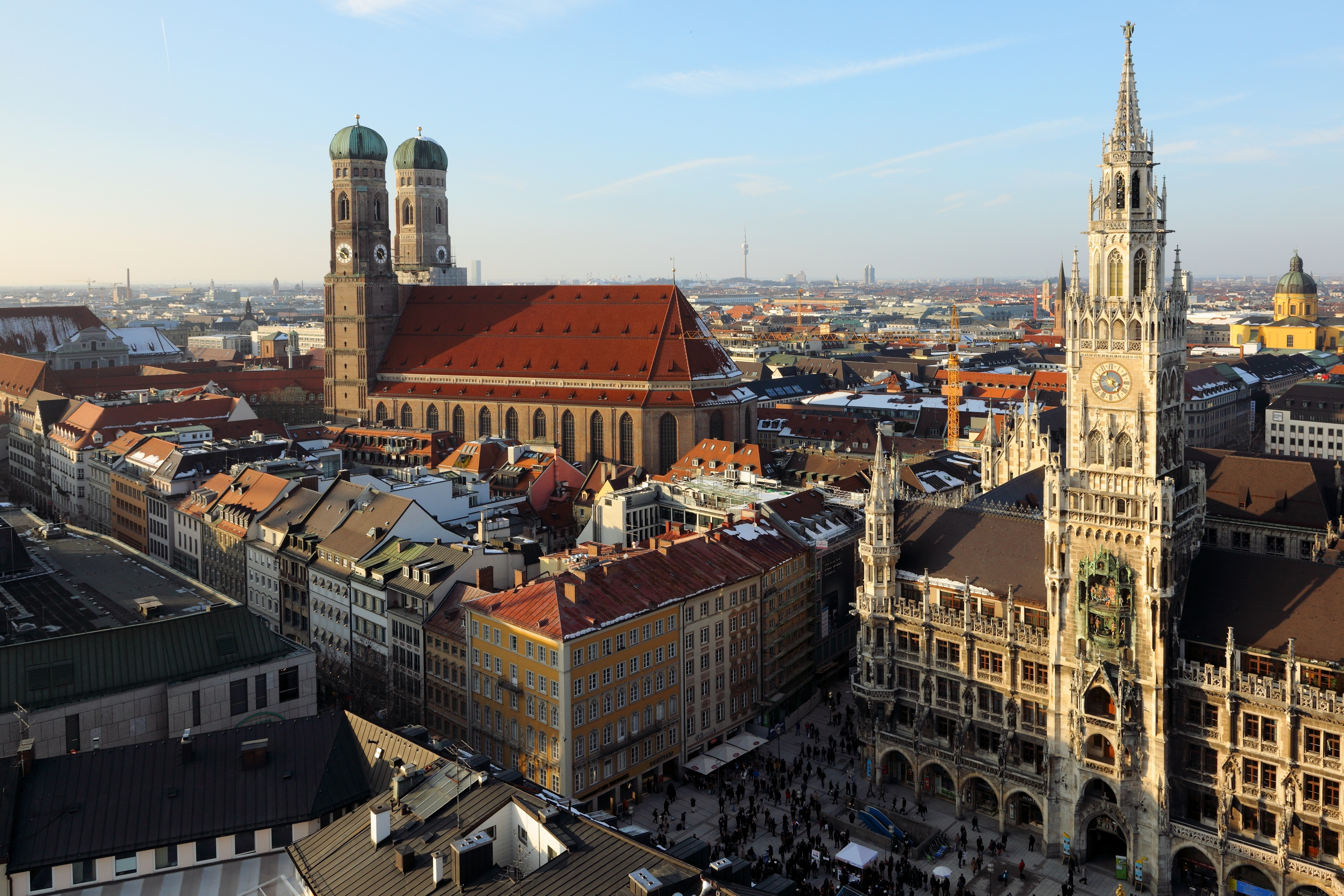
Munich

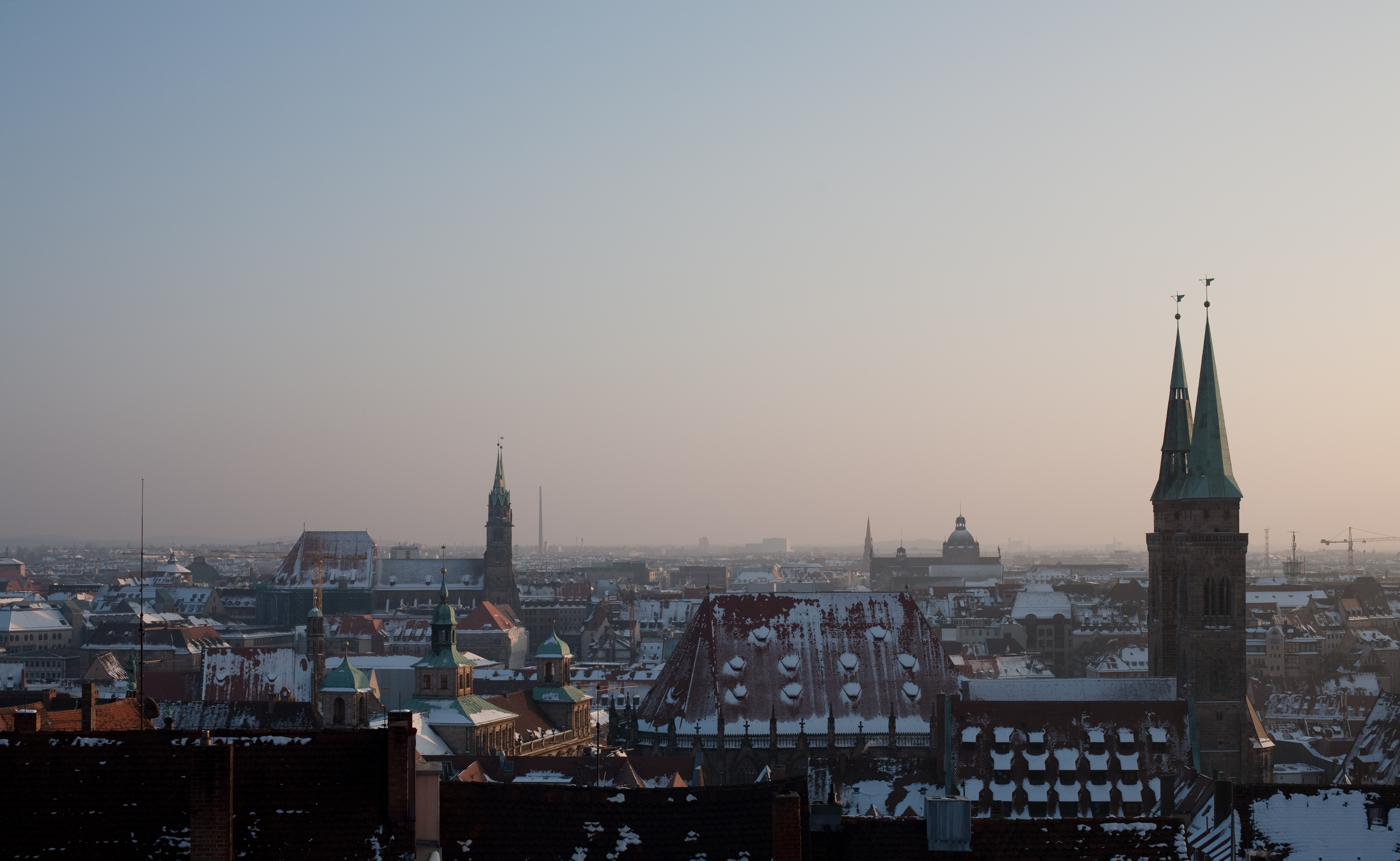
Nuremberg

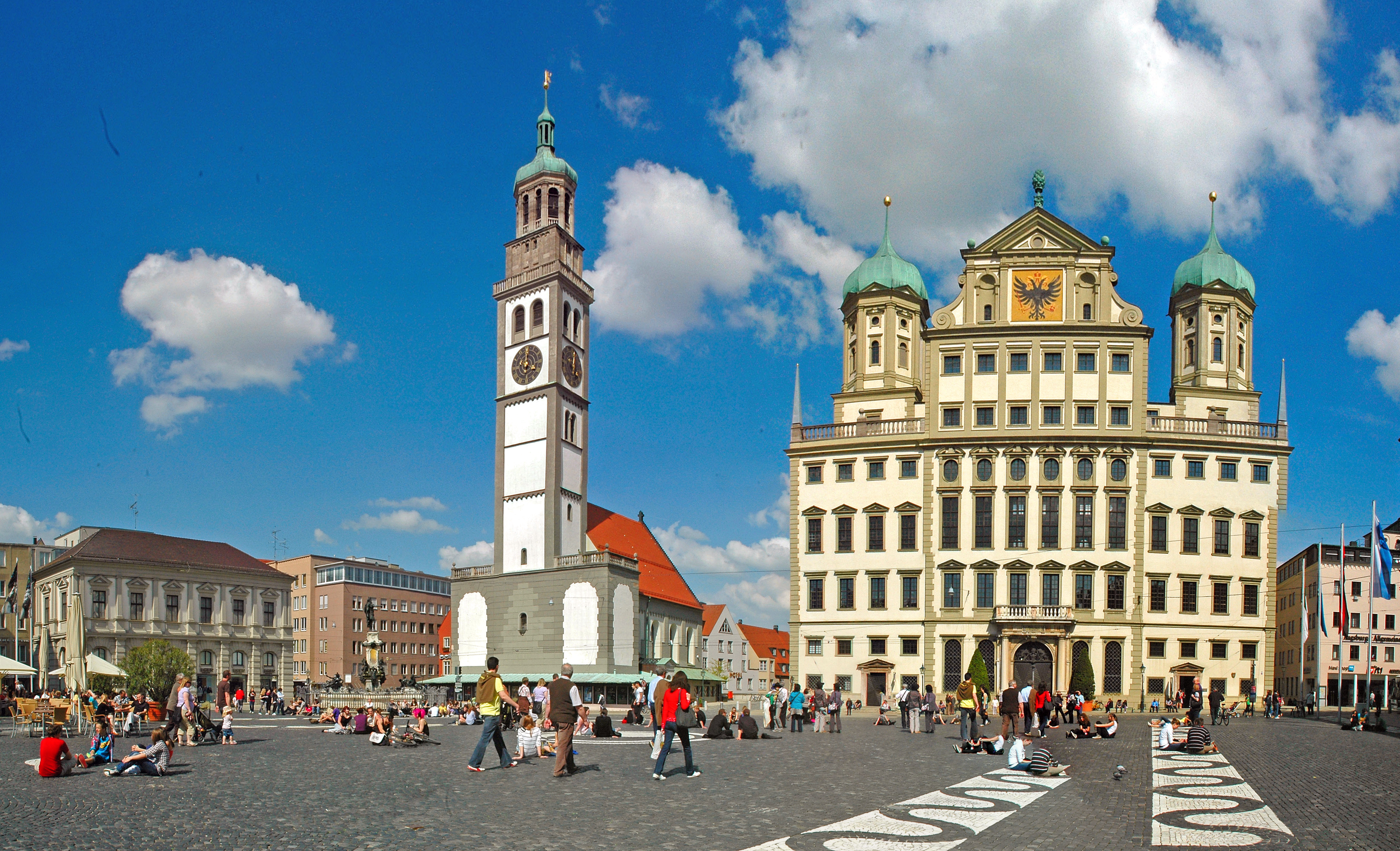
Augsburg

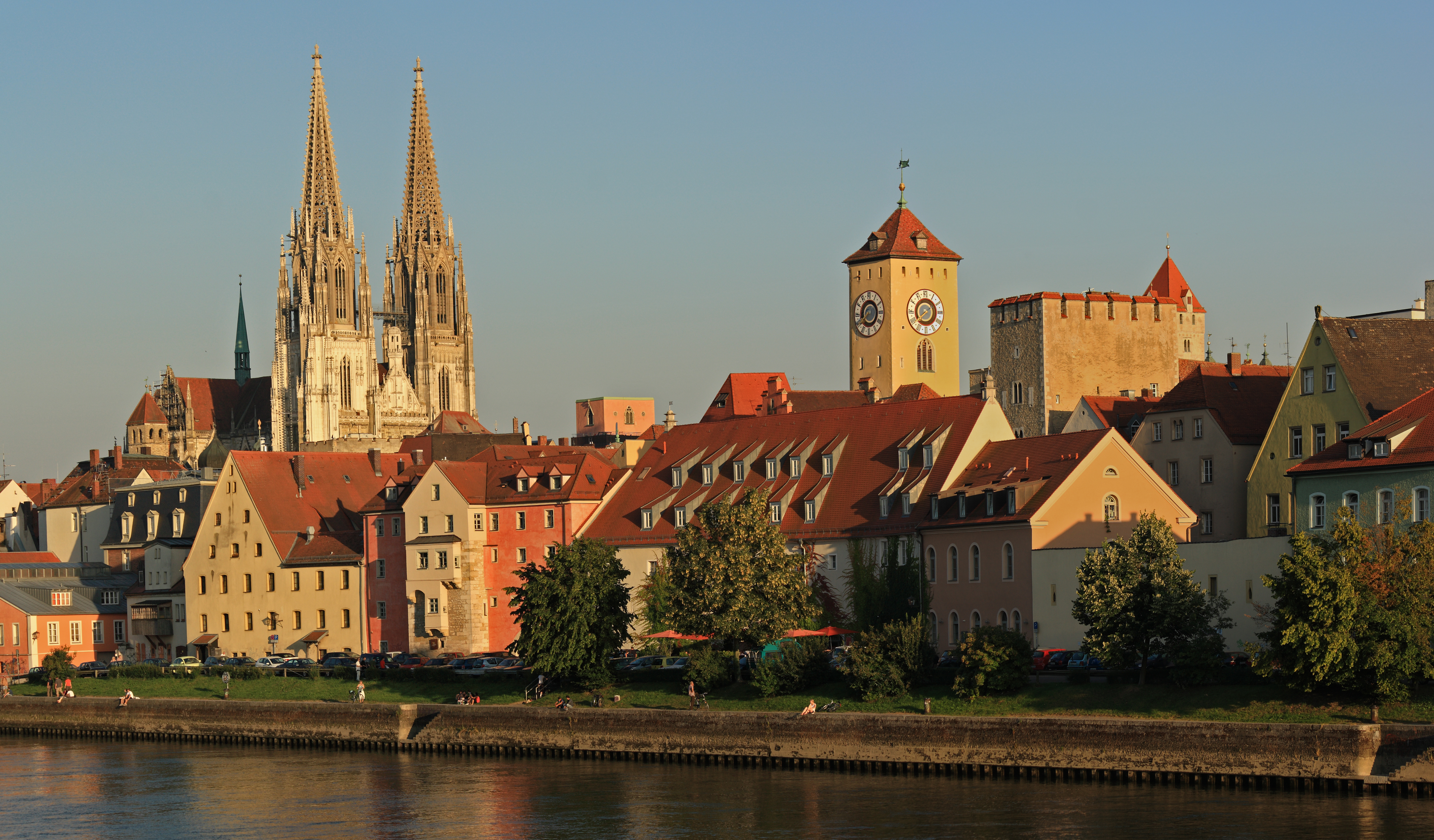
Regensburg

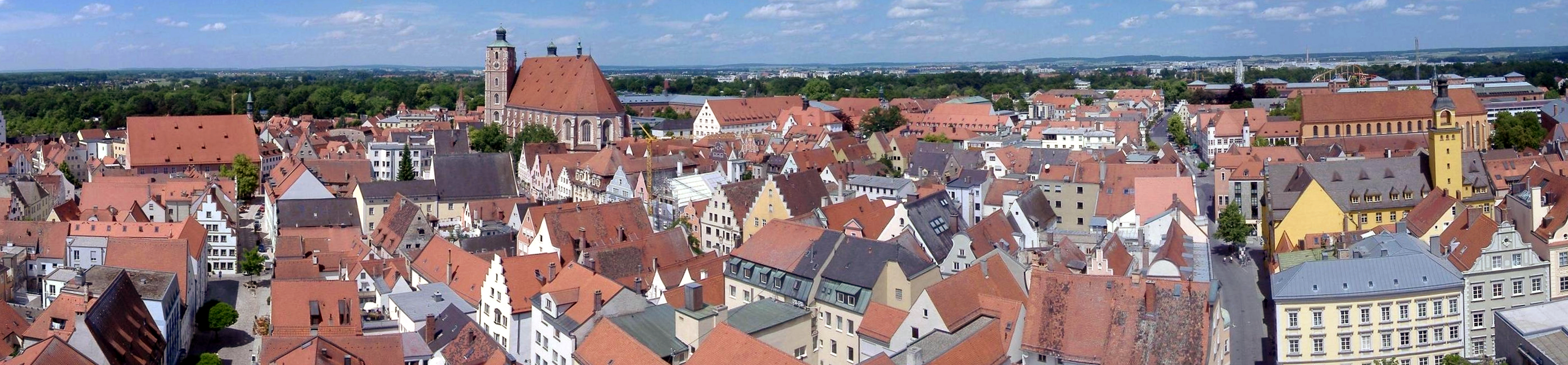
Ingolstadt

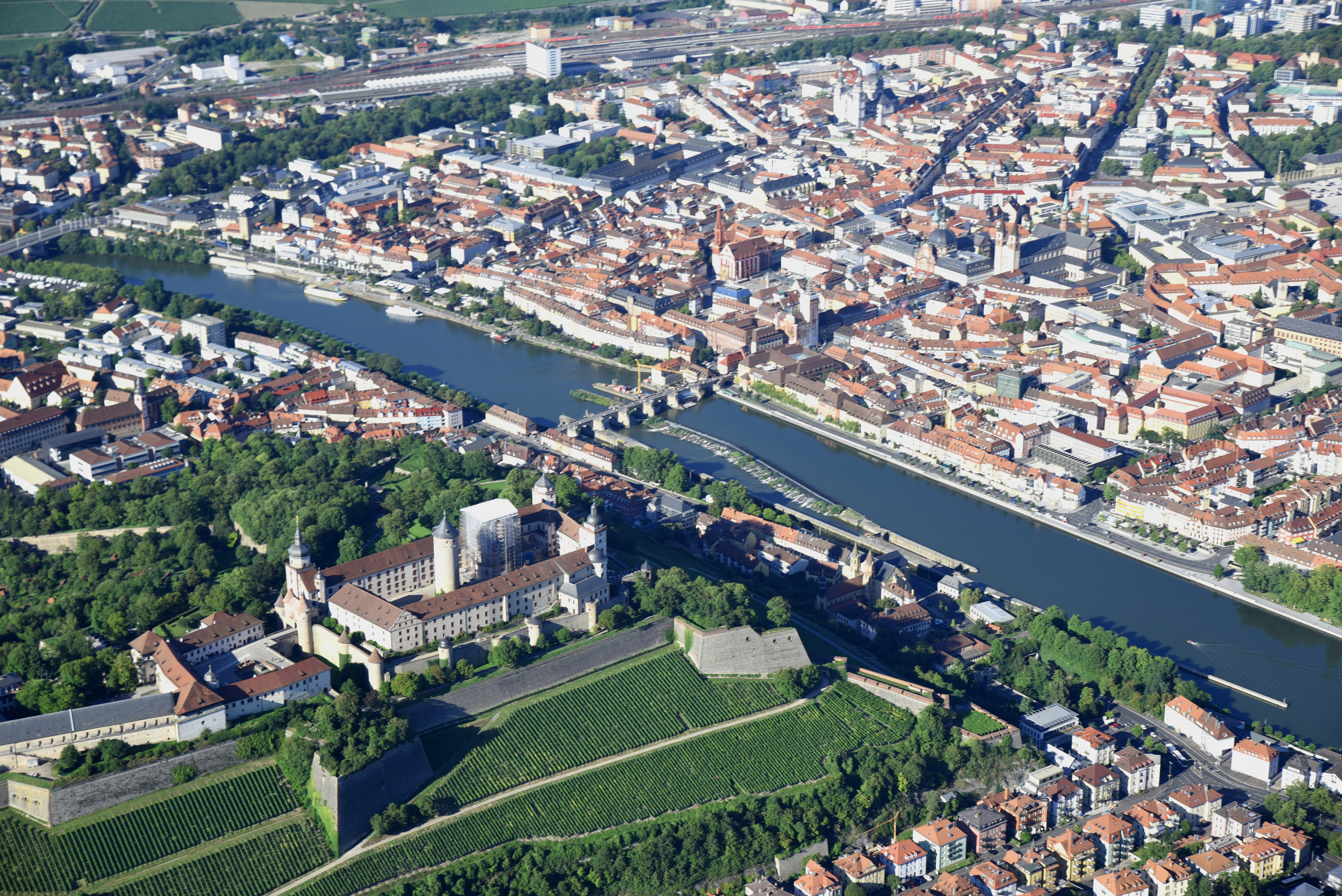
Würzburg

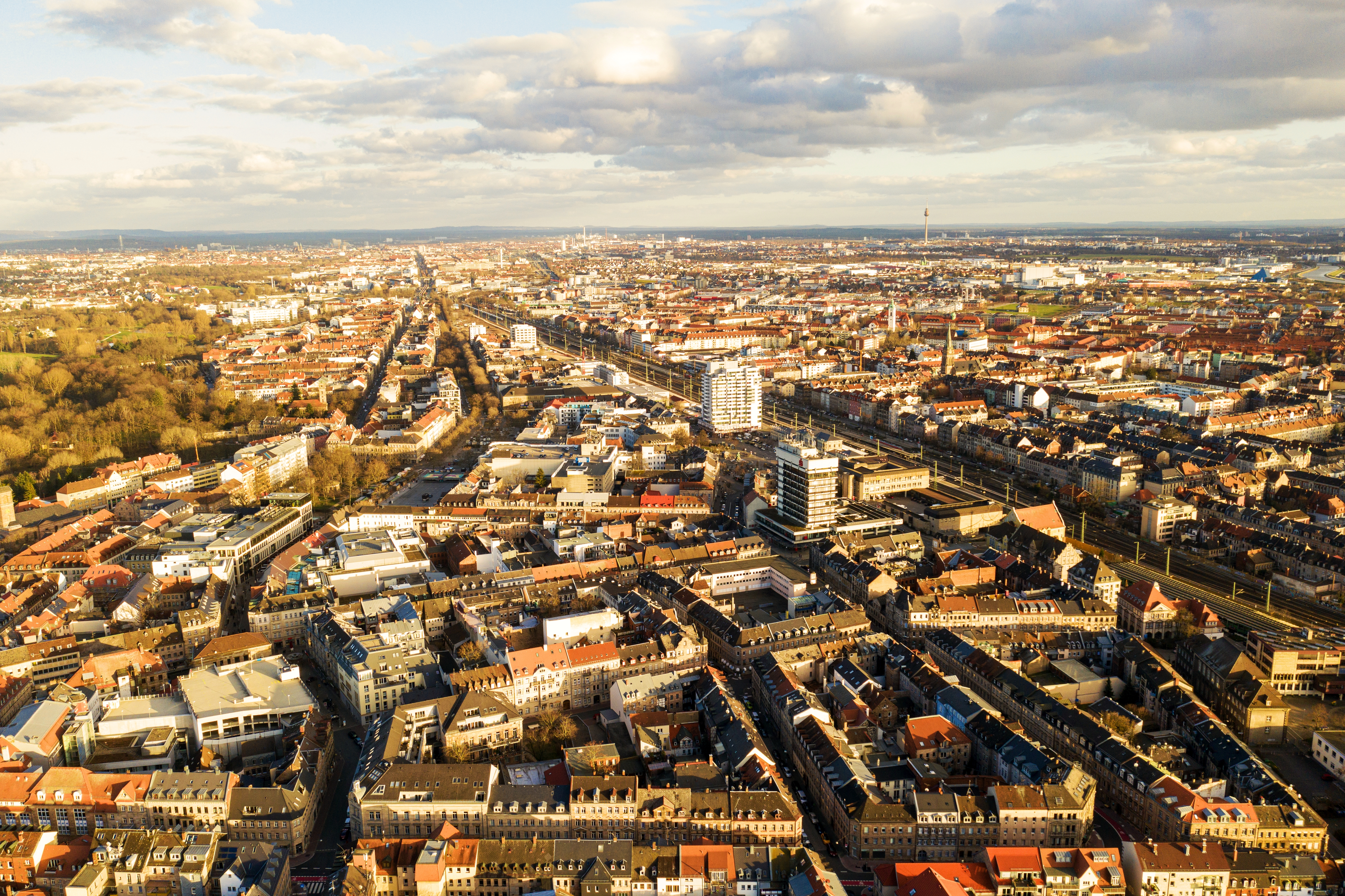
Fürth

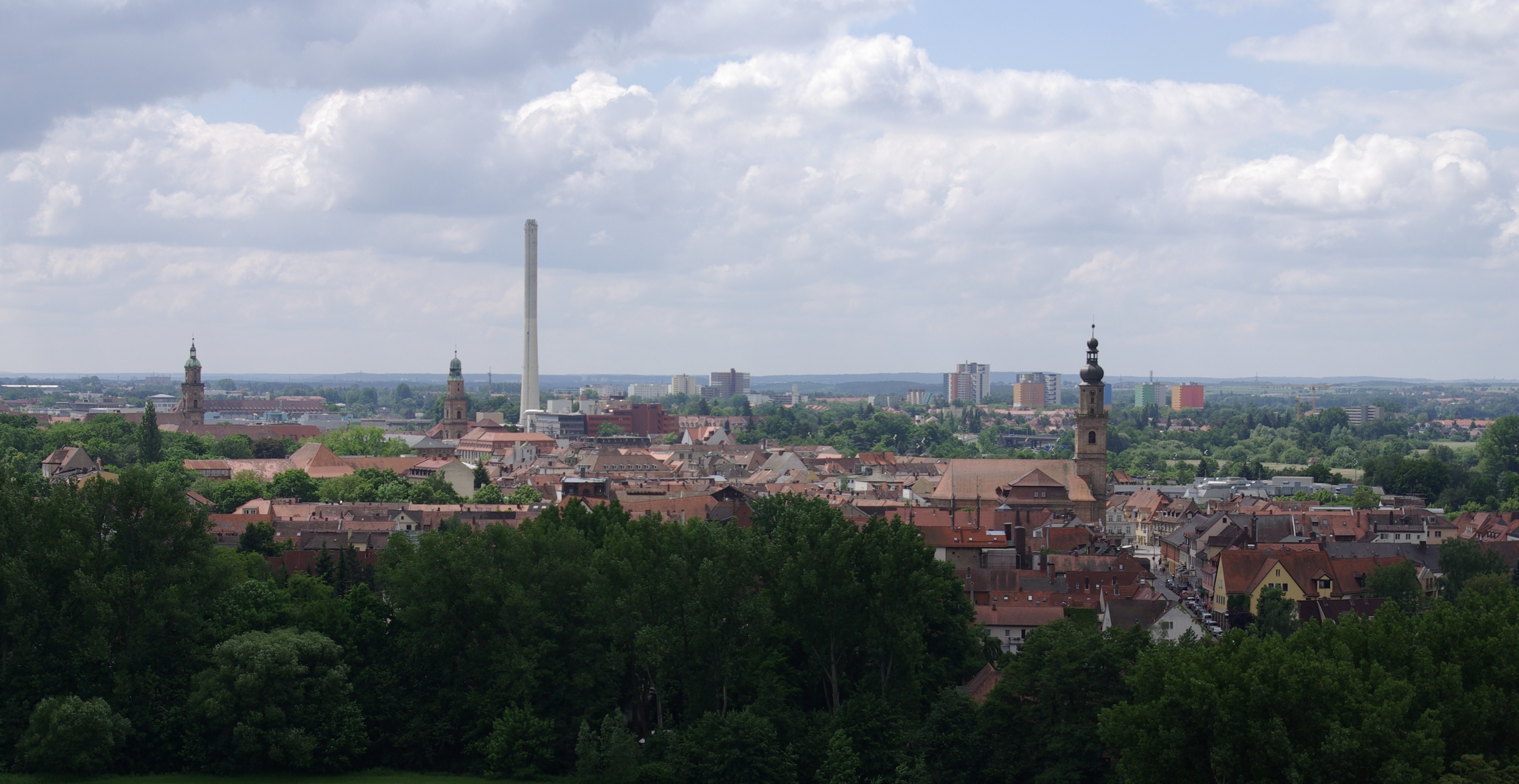
Erlangen

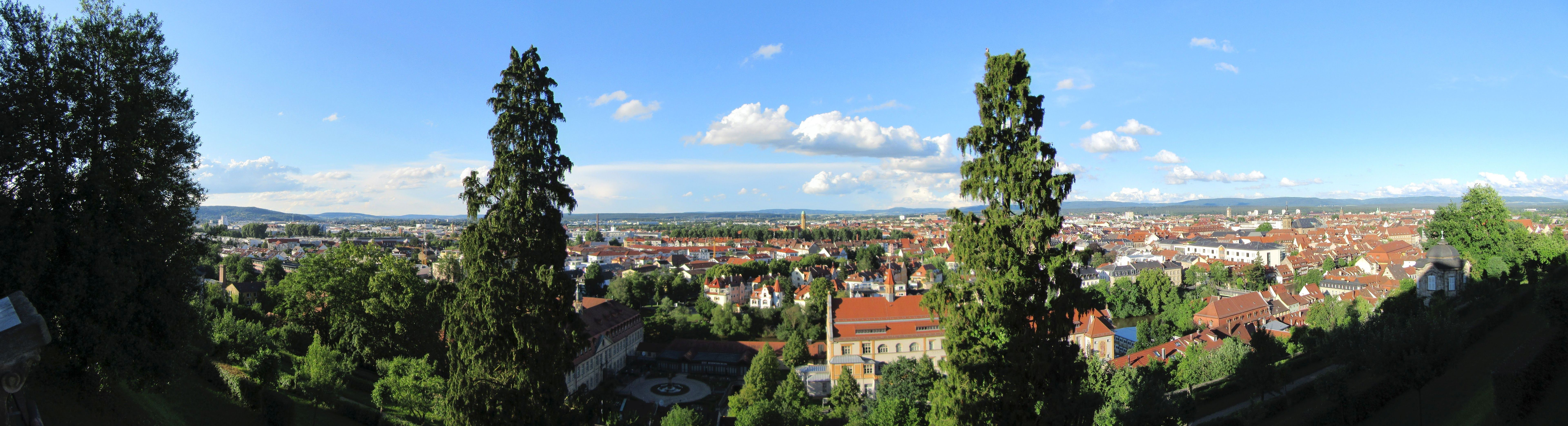
Bamberg

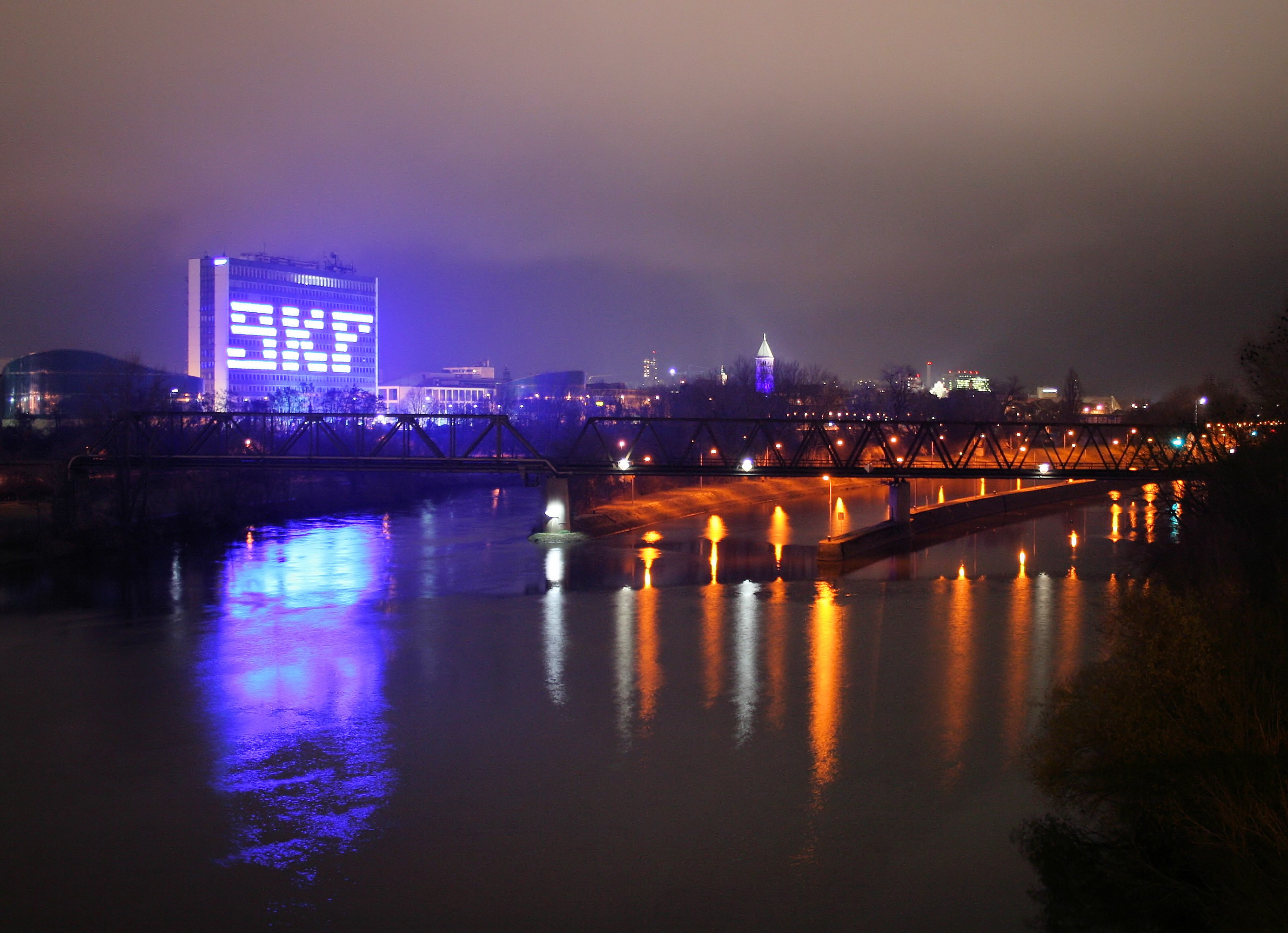
Schweinfurt

The following table lists the 75 cities and municipalities in Bavaria with a population of at least 20,000 on May 15, 2022, as estimated by the Federal Statistical Office of Germany. A city is displayed in bold if it is a state or federal capital.

1. The city rank by population as of May 15, 2022, as enumerated by the 2022 German census
2. The city name
3. The name of the district (Landkreis) in which the city lies (some cities are districts on their own called urban districts)
4. The city population as of May 15, 2022, as enumerated by the 2022 German census
5. The city population as of May 9, 2011, as enumerated by the 2011 European Union census
6. The city land area as of May 15, 2022
7. The city population density as of May 15, 2022 (residents per unit of land area)
8. Yearly population growth since 2011

2022 rank	City	District	2022 census	2011 census	2022 land area	2022 pop. density	Growth (2011–2022)
1	**Munich**	urban district	1,478,638	1,348,335	311 km^{2}	4,759/km^{2}	+0.84%
2	Nuremberg	urban district	522,554	486,314	186 km^{2}	2,803/km^{2}	+0.65%
3	Augsburg	urban district	294,647	267,767	147 km^{2}	2,006/km^{2}	+0.87%
4	Regensburg	urban district	145,901	135,403	80.9 km^{2}	1,894/km^{2}	+0.68%
5	Ingolstadt	urban district	136,468	124,927	133 km^{2}	1,023/km^{2}	+0.81%
6	Würzburg	urban district	131,316	124,297	87.6 km^{2}	1,499/km^{2}	+0.50%
7	Fürth	urban district	130,126	115,613	63.4 km^{2}	2,054/km^{2}	+1.08%
8	Erlangen	urban district	112,220	103,719	77.0 km^{2}	1,458/km^{2}	+0.72%
9	Bamberg	urban district	72,764	70,635	54.6 km^{2}	1,332/km^{2}	+1.34%
10	Bayreuth	urban district	72,289	70,808	66.9 km^{2}	1,081/km^{2}	+0.19%
11	Aschaffenburg	urban district	71,692	67,359	62.5 km^{2}	1,148/km^{2}	+0.57%
12	Landshut	urban district	67,880	63,544	65.8 km^{2}	1,031/km^{2}	+0.60%
13	Kempten (Allgäu)	urban district	65,050	64,078	63.3 km^{2}	1,028/km^{2}	+0.14%
14	Rosenheim	urban district	63,284	59,329	37.2 km^{2}	1,700/km^{2}	+0.59%
15	Neu-Ulm	Neu-Ulm (district)	60,597	52,706	81.0 km^{2}	749/km^{2}	+1.27%
16	Schweinfurt	urban district	53,242	52,143	35.7 km^{2}	1,491/km^{2}	+0.19%
17	Passau	urban district	51,907	48,649	69.6 km^{2}	746/km^{2}	+0.59%
18	Freising	Freising (district)	47,727	44,578	88.6 km^{2}	539/km^{2}	+0.62%
19	Straubing	urban district	46,167	44,488	67.6 km^{2}	683/km^{2}	+0.34%
20	Dachau	Dachau (district)	45,965	43,402	35.0 km^{2}	1,315/km^{2}	+0.52%
21	Hof	urban district	45,598	44,759	58.0 km^{2}	786/km^{2}	+0.17%
22	Kaufbeuren	urban district	45,186	41,550	40.0 km^{2}	1,129/km^{2}	+0.76%
23	Memmingen	urban district	43,300	41,241	70.1 km^{2}	618/km^{2}	+0.44%
24	Weiden in der Oberpfalz	urban district	42,047	41,746	70.6 km^{2}	596/km^{2}	+0.07%
25	Amberg	urban district	41,876	41,911	50.1 km^{2}	835/km^{2}	–0.01%
26	Schwabach	urban district	40,865	38,469	40.8 km^{2}	1,002/km^{2}	+0.55%
27	Coburg	urban district	40,296	41,023	48.3 km^{2}	835/km^{2}	–0.16%
28	Neumarkt in der Oberpfalz	Neumarkt (district)	40,232	38,362	79.0 km^{2}	509/km^{2}	+0.43%
29	Germering	Fürstenfeldbruck (district)	39,897	37,724	21.6 km^{2}	1,846/km^{2}	+0.51%
30	Ansbach	urban district	39,601	39,491	99.9 km^{2}	396/km^{2}	+0.03%
31	Erding	Erding (district)	36,235	33,528	54.6 km^{2}	664/km^{2}	+0.71%
32	Fürstenfeldbruck	Fürstenfeldbruck (district)	35,844	33,379	32.5 km^{2}	1,102/km^{2}	+0.65%
33	Deggendorf	Deggendorf (district)	33,563	31,491	77.1 km^{2}	435/km^{2}	+0.58%
34	Forchheim	Forchheim (district)	32,041	30,329	44.5 km^{2}	721/km^{2}	+0.50%
35	Neuburg an der Donau	Neuburg-Schrobenhausen	29,629	27,733	81.3 km^{2}	365/km^{2}	+0.60%
36	Friedberg	Aichach-Friedberg	29,595	28,640	81.3 km^{2}	364/km^{2}	+0.30%
37	Schwandorf	Schwandorf (district)	29,096	27,556	124 km^{2}	235/km^{2}	+0.49%
38	Landsberg am Lech	Landsberg (district)	28,441	27,324	57.9 km^{2}	491/km^{2}	+0.36%
39	Garmisch-Partenkirchen	Garmisch (district)	28,173	25,581	206 km^{2}	137/km^{2}	+0.88%
40	Unterschleißheim	Munich (district)	28,114	25,872	14.9 km^{2}	1,930/km^{2}	+0.76%
41	Königsbrunn	Augsburg (district)	27,726	26,997	18.4 km^{2}	1,507/km^{2}	+0.24%
42	Olching	Fürstenfeldbruck (district)	27,317	24,751	29.9 km^{2}	913/km^{2}	+0.90%
43	Zirndorf	Fürth (district)	26,234	24,752	28.8 km^{2}	911/km^{2}	+0.53%
44	Kulmbach	Kulmbach (district)	26,159	26,678	92.8 km^{2}	282/km^{2}	–0.18%
45	Unterhaching	Munich (district)	26,073	22,298	10.4 km^{2}	2,514/km^{2}	+1.43%
46	Lauf an der Pegnitz	Nürnberger Land	26,019	25,629	59.8 km^{2}	435/km^{2}	+0.14%
47	Geretsried	Bad Tölz-Wolfratshausen	25,705	23,042	24.6 km^{2}	1,045/km^{2}	+1.00%
48	Pfaffenhofen an der Ilm	Pfaffenhofen (district)	25,700	23,603	92.6 km^{2}	277/km^{2}	+0.78%
49	Lindau (Bodensee)	Lindau (district)	25,394	24,491	33.1 km^{2}	768/km^{2}	+0.33%
50	Waldkraiburg	Mühldorf (district)	25,382	21,435	21.6 km^{2}	1,177/km^{2}	+1.55%
51	Roth	Roth (district)	25,281	24,348	96.3 km^{2}	263/km^{2}	+0.34%
52	Vaterstetten	Ebersberg (district)	24,250	21,069	34.1 km^{2}	712/km^{2}	+1.28%
53	Starnberg	Starnberg (district)	24,168	22,165	61.9 km^{2}	391/km^{2}	+0.79%
54	Herzogenaurach	Erlangen-Höchstadt	23,750	22,214	47.6 km^{2}	4899/km^{2}	+0.61%
55	Senden	Neu-Ulm (district)	23,237	21,560	25.2 km^{2}	922/km^{2}	+0.68%
56	Gersthofen	Augsburg (district)	22,972	20,743	34.0 km^{2}	675/km^{2}	+0.93%
57	Bad Kissingen	Bad Kissingen (district)	22,924	20,993	69.9 km^{2}	328/km^{2}	+0.80%
58	Weilheim in Oberbayern	Weilheim-Schongau	22,720	21,149	55.5 km^{2}	409/km^{2}	+0.65%
59	Ottobrunn	Munich (district)	22,311	20,082	5.2 km^{2}	4,266/km^{2}	+0.96%
60	Neusäß	Augsburg (district)	22,178	21,052	25.2 km^{2}	879/km^{2}	+0.47%
61	Kitzingen	Kitzingen (district)	21,982	20,237	47.0 km^{2}	468/km^{2}	+0.75%
62	Mühldorf am Inn	Mühldorf am Inn (district)	21,917	16,807	29.4 km^{2}	684.0/km^{2}	+2.44%
63	Gauting	Starnberg (district)	21,583	19,294	55.5 km^{2}	389/km^{2}	+1.02%
64	Haar	Munich (district)	21,427	19,231	12.9 km^{2}	1,661/km^{2}	+0.99%
65	Sonthofen	Oberallgäu	21,381	21,105	46.5 km^{2}	459/km^{2}	+0.12%
66	Aichach	Aichach-Friedberg	21,328	20,247	92.8 km^{2}	230/km^{2}	+0.47%
67	Günzburg	Günzburg (district)	21,172	19,436	55.4 km^{2}	382/km^{2}	+0.78%
68	Karlsfeld	Dachau (district)	21,168	18,117	15.6 km^{2}	1,356/km^{2}	+1.42%
69	Puchheim	Fürstenfeldbruck (district)	20,950	19,613	12.2 km^{2}	1,72/km^{2}	+0.60%
70	Neufahrn bei Freising	Freising (district)	20,464	18,392	45.5 km^{2}	449/km^{2}	+0.97%
71	Lichtenfels	Lichtenfels (district)	20,352	20,204	122 km^{2}	167/km^{2}	+0.07%
72	Traunstein	Traunstein (district)	20,248	18,635	48.6 km^{2}	417/km^{2}	+0.76%
73	Dingolfing	Dingolfing-Landau	20,221	17,773	44.0 km^{2}	460/km^{2}	+1.18%
74	Nördlingen	Donau-Ries	20,185	19,051	68.1 km^{2}	296/km^{2}	+0.53%
75	Traunreut	Traunstein (district)	20,125	19,941	45.1 km^{2}	447/km^{2}	+0.08%
