= Allacher Forest =

Nature reserve in Bavaria, Germany

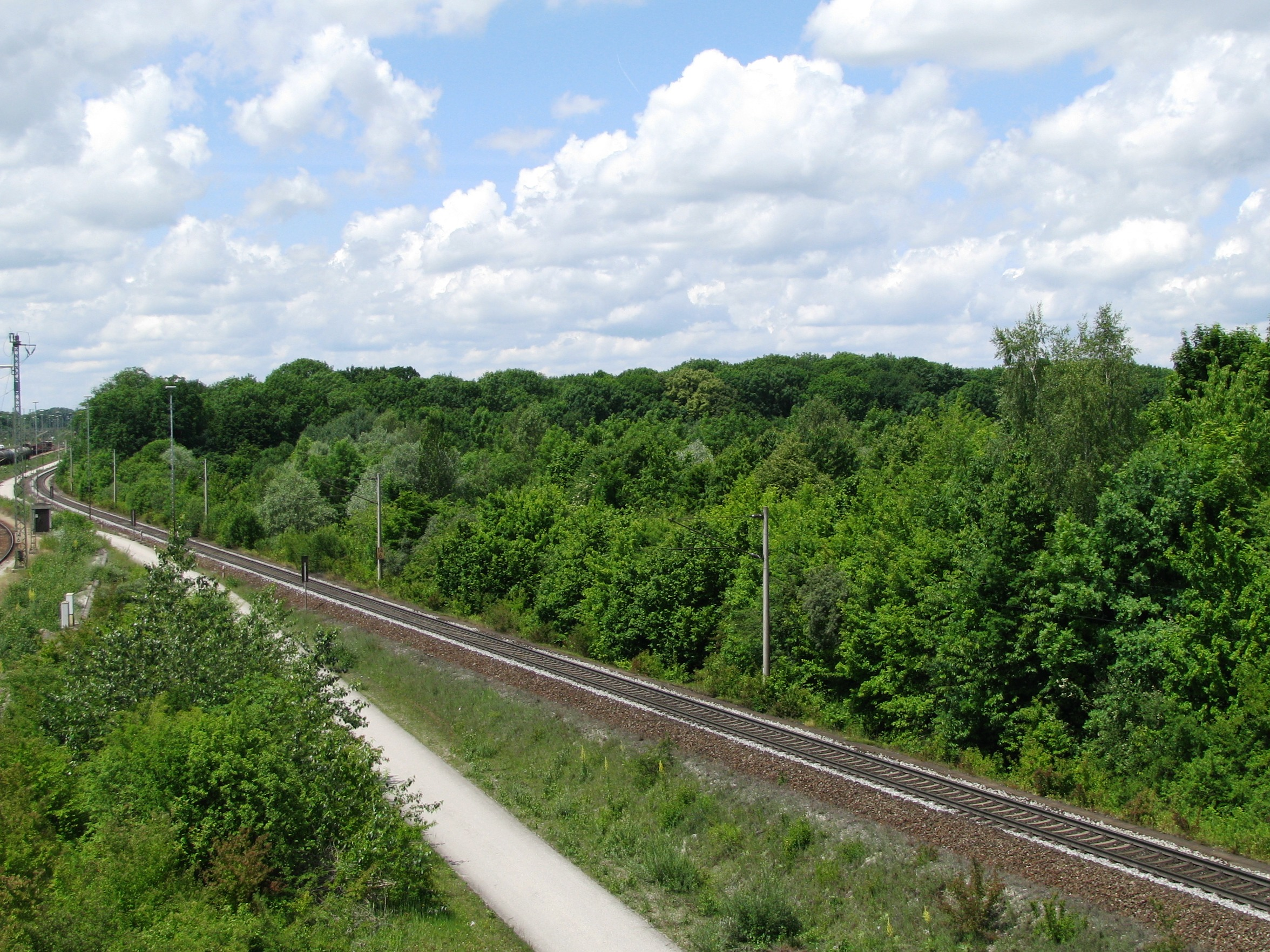
Allacher Forest

The Allacher Forest is a forest north of Munich, in the district of Allach-Untermenzing.

== Location ==
The Allacher Forest is located north of the Munich North marshalling train yard, between the Munich districts of Allach, Ludwigsfeld and Karlsfeld, a municipality of the district of Dachau.

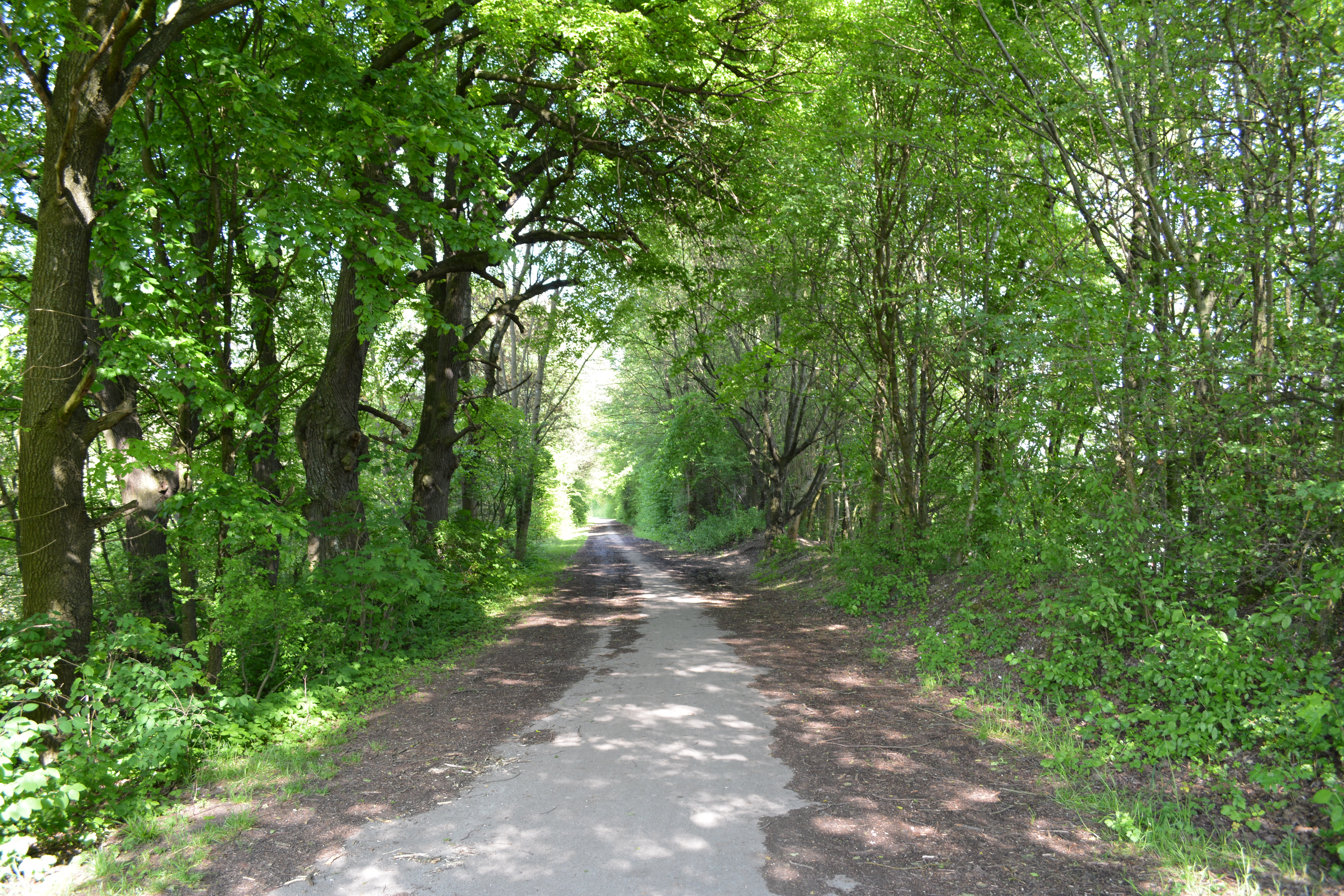
Allacher Forest

== Ecosystem ==
The Allacher Forest is a remnant of the former Lohwaldgürtel north of Munich with over 1 km² area. In addition to old linden trees and oak trees, there are also sycamore maples, spruces, mountain elms, pine trees and ash trees. Numerous types of flowers bloom here in the spring - including lungwort, cowslip or wood anemone. In addition, there are more than 300 different types of mushrooms there.

The Munich North marshalling yard - a large displacement and container station, was built on the southern edge of the Allacher Forest in 1991. This led to criticism from conservationists since 174 hectares of biotope area was destroyed. On a 5 km long and 500 m wide area, with 356 connections and over 120 km of tracks, up to 4000 railway cars are handled there every day. The Allacher Forest is now a rare riparian forest, that after massive protests from the population and the experts, the A99 motorway ring Munich Northwest crosses under the Allacher Forst in the so-called Tunnel Allach.

The landscape lake Allacher Lohe, as well as a forest classroom are found in the forest.

The Allacher Forest is designated as a nature conservation reserve (NSG-00573.01, WDPA ID: 318087) and the northwestern part is also a landscape conservation area (LSG-00120.06, WDPA ID: 395563). Furthermore, the Allacher Forst is reported together with the south located Angerlohe as a fauna-flora-habitat area (FFH area No. 7734-302) for the European biotope network to the European Union.

The Allacher Forest is part of the Münchner Grüngürtel (Munich green belt).
