= Allach-Untermenzing =

Borough of Munich, Germany

Coordinates: 48°12′00″N 11°27′10″E

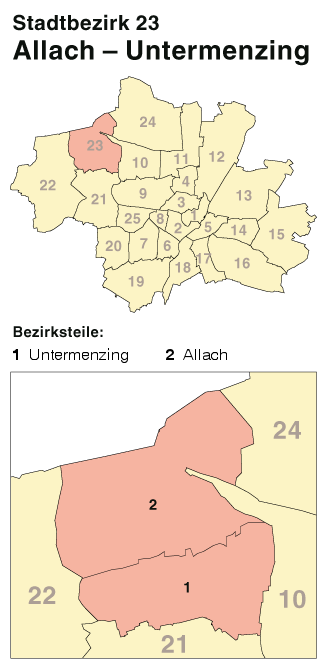

Allach-Untermenzing (German pronunciation: [ˈalax ʔʊntɐˈmɛntsɪŋ]; Central Bavarian: Allach-Untamenzing) is the 23rd borough of Munich, Bavaria, Germany.

== Allach ==
Situated in extreme northwest of the city, the borough consists of the municipalities of Allach and Untermenzing (lit. 'Lower Menzing'). Allach was first documented on March 30, 774 as Ahaloh. The name means "forest by the water", where "aha" means water and "loh" means forest. Over time, "loh" became "lach". Allach is one of the oldest independent municipalities in Bavaria. Politically and regionally it was connected to Dachau.

== Notable landmarks ==
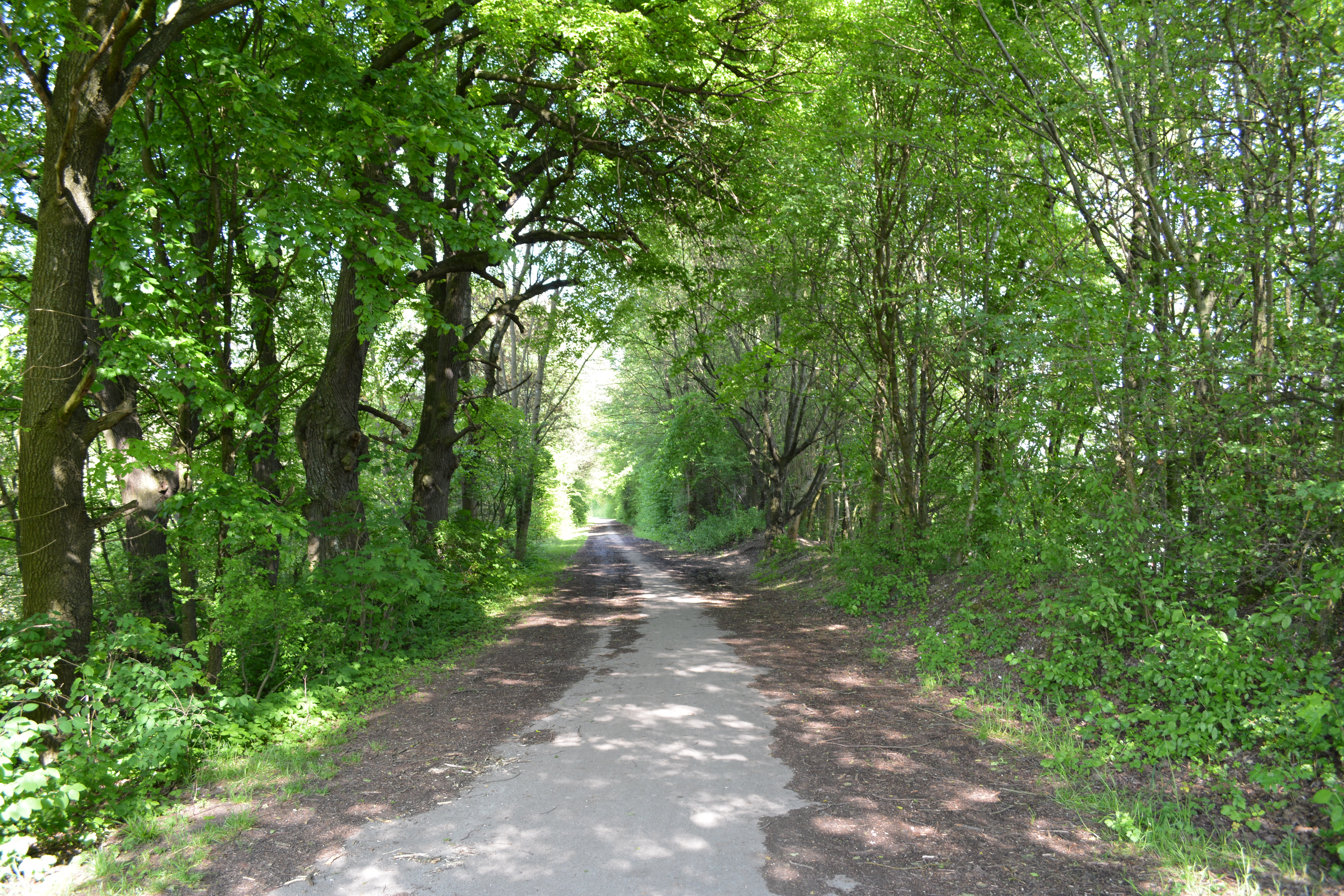
Allacher Forst forest

- Allacher Forst
- Bundestagswahlkreis München-West/Mitte
- Diamalt
- Lochholz
- Stimmkreis München-Pasing
