= Pfaffenhofen =

Pfaffenhofen is the name of several places in Europe:

In Germany:

- Pfaffenhofen an der Ilm, a town in Bavaria
- Pfaffenhofen (district), in Bavaria
- Pfaffenhofen an der Glonn, a municipality in Dachau, Bavaria
- a part of the municipality of Altomünster in Dachau, Bavaria
- Pfaffenhofen an der Roth, a municipality in Neu-Ulm, Bavaria
- Pfaffenhofen, Baden-Württemberg, a municipality in Heilbronn, Baden-Württemberg

In Austria:

- Pfaffenhofen, Tyrol, a municipality in Innsbruck-Land, Tyrol

== See also ==
- Pfaffenhoffen in Alsacia, France
