= Dachau, Bavaria =

Town in Upper Bavaria, Germany

Dachau
- Town
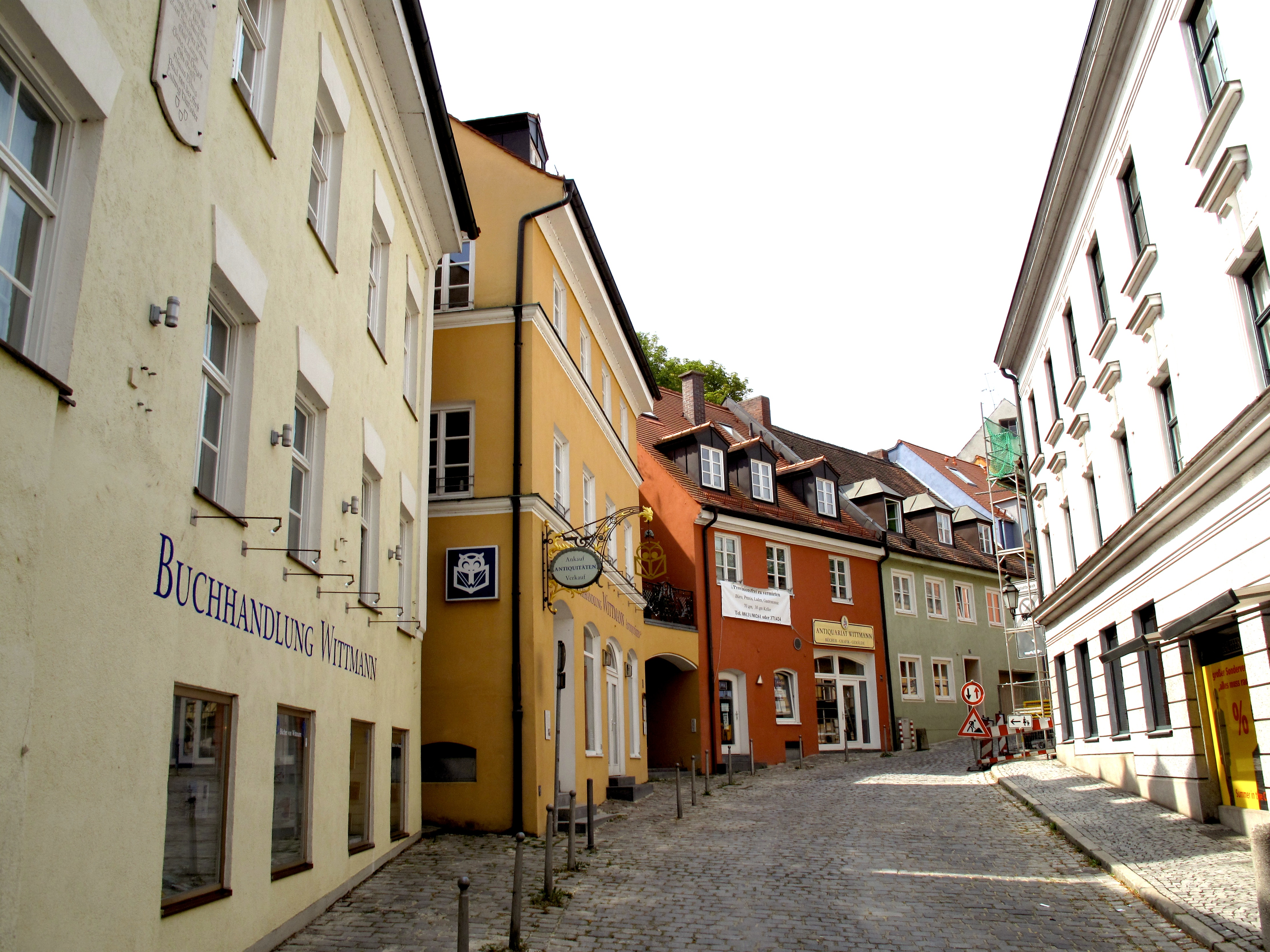

- Coat of arms

- Location of Dachau within Dachau district
- Interactive map of Dachau
- Location within Germany Location within Bavaria
- Coordinates: 48°15′37″N 11°26′3″E
- Country: Germany
- State: Bavaria
- Admin. region: Oberbayern
- District: Dachau

Government
  - Mayor (2020–26): Florian Hartmann (SPD)

Area
  - Total: 34.96 km^{2} (13.50 sq mi)
- Elevation: 483 m (1,585 ft)

Population (2025-12-31)
  - Total: 47,461
  - Density: 1,358/km^{2} (3,516/sq mi)
- Time zone: UTC+01:00 (CET)
  - Summer (DST): UTC+02:00 (CEST)
- Postal codes: 85221
- Dialling codes: 08131
- Vehicle registration: DAH
- Website: www.dachau.de

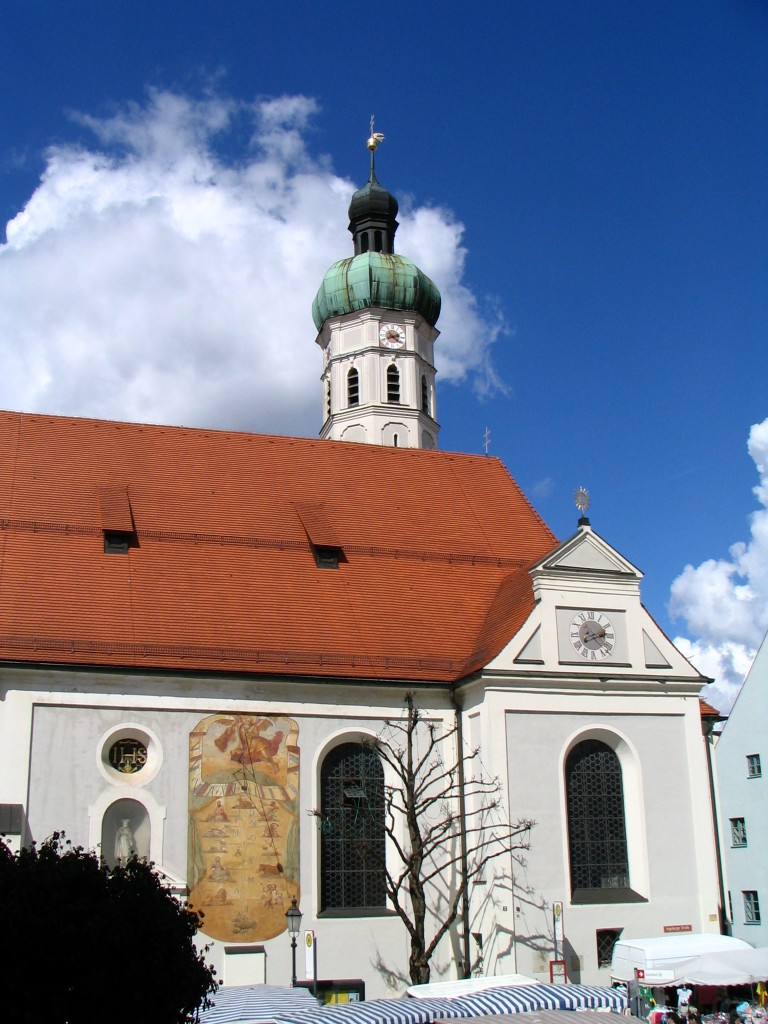
Church of St Jakob, Dachau

Dachau (German pronunciation: [ˈdaxaʊ]) is a town in the Upper Bavaria district of Bavaria, a state in the southern part of Germany. It is a major district town—a Große Kreisstadt—of the administrative region of Upper Bavaria, about 20 kilometres (12 miles) north-west of Munich. It is now a popular residential area for people working in Munich, with roughly 45,000 inhabitants. The historic centre of town with its 18th-century castle is situated on an elevation and visible over a great distance.

Dachau was founded in the 9th century. It was home to many artists during the late 19th and early 20th centuries; well-known author and editor Ludwig Thoma lived here for two years. The town is known for its proximity to the Dachau concentration camp, operated by Nazi Germany between 1933 until 1945, in which tens of thousands of prisoners died.

== Etymology ==
The name "Dachau" originated in the Celtic Dahauua, which roughly translates to "loamy meadow" and also alludes to the loamy soil of the surrounding hills. Some theories assume the name "Amper" river, which the town lies on, may derive from the Celtic word for "water". An alternative idea is that it comes from the Old High German word daha meaning clay, and ouwe, water overflown land.

== History ==
=== Prehistoric times and Early Middle Ages ===
As the Amper River would divert into backwaters in several places, there were many fords making it possible to cross the river. The oldest findings of human presence here date back to the Stone Age. The most noteworthy findings were discovered near Feldgeding in the adjoining municipality Bergkirchen. Around 1000 B.C. the Celts arrived in this area and settled. Approximately at the turn of the first millennium the Romans conquered the area and incorporated it into the province of Rhaetia. A Roman trade road between Salzburg and today's Augsburg is said to have run through Dachau. Remains of this old route are found along the Amper marshlands.

=== Middle Ages ===
The first known documentation of Dachau occurs in a medieval deed issued by the Noble Erchana of Dahauua to the prince-bishop of Freising, both descendants of the lineage of the Aribonids. With this deed, dated to August 15, 805 A.D. (the Feast of the Assumption of the Blessed Virgin Mary), she donated her entire property in Dachau, including five so-called Colonenhöfe and some serfs and bondsman, to devolve to the Bishop of the Diocese of Freising after her death.

During much of the 12th century, Dachau was the primary residence of a smaller branch from the House of Wittelsbach led by Otto I, Count of Scheyern-Dauchau. When Conrad III died in 1182, Duke Otto I of Bavaria purchased the land and granted it market rights, that were then affirmed between 1270 and 1280 by Duke Ludwig II der Strenge (the Strict).

In 1467 Sigismund, Duke of Bavaria resigned and then kept only Bavaria-Dachau as his domain until his death in 1501.

=== From the 16th century to modern times ===
Between 1546 and 1577, the House of Wittelsbach had the Dachau Palace erected in the Renaissance style. From June 1715 to Autumn 1717, Joseph Effner remodeled the palace to suit the contemporary taste in style.

At the beginning of the 19th century, the castle's north-, east- and south-wing had to be demolished due to their state of disrepair. The west-wing housing the dance hall with a superb view of the enchanting gardens, still remains today. On the first floor the original renaissance wood carved, coffered ceiling can be admired by visitors.

During the second half of the 19th century, the town began to attract landscape artists. The Dachau art colony, which flourished between 1890 and 1914, brought the town recognition as one of the most important artist's colonies in Germany beside Worpswede.

=== Nazi era ===
In 1933, the Dachau concentration camp was built east of the city by the SS of Nazi Germany and operated until 1945. It was the first of what became many Nazi concentration camps. 14,100 prisoners were killed in the camp by the Nazis and almost another 10,000 in its sub-camps. Despite later denials, residents were aware of the trainloads of prisoners and corpses that passed through the city. "No citizen of Dachau is without a deep sense that something was wrong, terribly wrong, on the outskirts of their town", Seventh United States Army's G-2 wrote:

"Those who really did not give a damn were few. Those who did show opposition should be honored. But it should be pointed out in justice to the others that they were people who could seclude themselves from the community without harming their sources of income".

== Geography ==
=== Geographical location ===
Dachau is 20 km (12 mi) northwest of Munich. It is 483 meters above sea level by the river Amper, with a boundary demarcated by lateral moraines formed during the last ice age and the Amper glacial valley. It is also close to a large marshy area called Dachauer Moos. Highest elevation of the district is the so-called "Schlossberg", the lowest point is near the neighborhood of Prittlbach, at the border to the next community of Hebertshausen. The bordering communities are Bergkirchen to the west, Schwabhausen to the northwest, Röhrmoos to the north, Hebertshausen to the northeast, and Karlsfeld to the south. To the east the greater district Dachau borders on the greater district of Munich with the community of Oberschleißheim.

== Local administrative divisions ==
=== Populated places ===
The city is divided into 3 zones:

- Historic Center: Dachau Old Town, Mitterndorf, Udlding, Etzenhausen, Unterer Markt, Webling
- Dachau-East: Oberaugustenfeld, Unteraugustenfeld, Polln, Obergrashof, parts of Prittlbach
- Dachau-South: Himmelreich, Holzgarten, parts of Gröbenried

=== Annexations ===
Since 1972, the former municipality of Pellheim, along with the communities of Pellheim proper, Pullhausen, Assenhausen, Lohfeld, and Viehgarten, have been incorporated into Dachau.

== Bodies of water ==
Running from the west, the river Amper runs south of Dachau's old town, changes its direction at the former paper milling plant to the northeast and continues through Prittlbach into Hebertshausen.

Coming from Karlsfeld, the Würm crosses Dachau-East and merges into the river Amper just outside the district limit of Hebertshausen.

The Gröbenbach, which has its source south of Puchheim, runs through town coming from the south and merges into the Amper river at several locations near the festival grounds.

The Mühlbach, a man made canal, is diverted from the river Amper at the electrical power plant and runs parallel and flows back into it after passing the paper mill. The name derives from the frequent mills in former times along the canal which took advantage of the decline between Mühlbach and Amper. West of the so-called Festwiese runs another canal, called Lodererbach.

In town there are still parts of the Schleißheimer canal remaining today. This canal was built in the mid-eighteenth century as part of the northern Munich canal system to which the Nymphenburger Canal belongs as well. It functioned as a transportation route between Dachau and Schleißheim. The building material recovered from the demolition of three wings of the Dachau castle was transported to Schleißheim this way.

By allowing it to run to seed and through deliberate cultivation by the town of Dachau the canal is only still recognizable as such between Frühlingstraße and the Pollnbach. Outside the city limit the original canal continues on to Schloss Schleißheim.

Within the city boundaries, in Dachau Süd (South), there is also a small lake called Stadtweiher.

== Transport ==
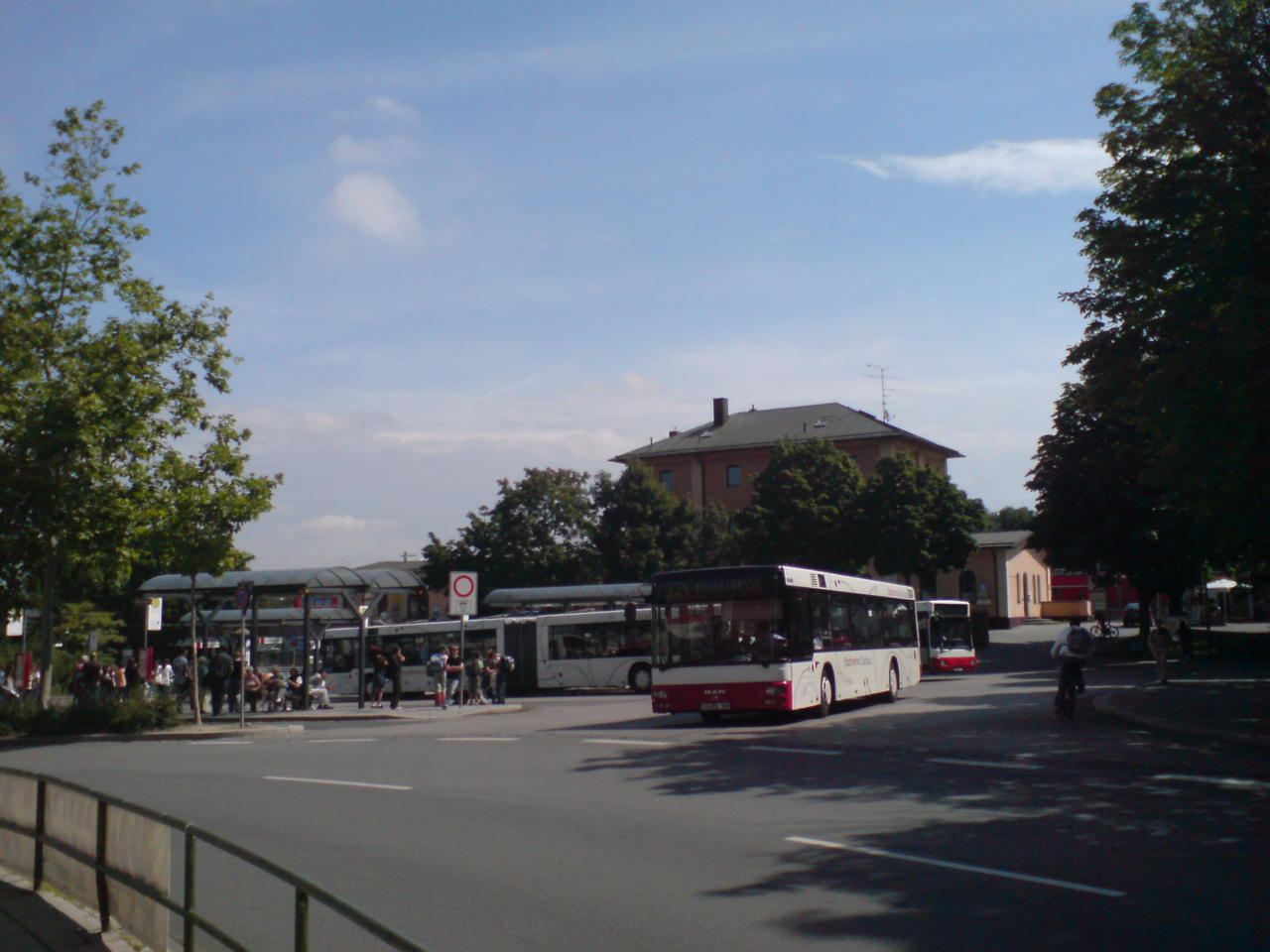
Dachau Train and Bus Station

The city is served by Munich S-Bahn (S2) and Deutsche Bahn via Dachau railway station located in the South of the town. The station is also annexed to the central bus terminal. In Dachau the line S2 is split in two directions: Petershausen and Altomünster. Both lines are named S2 but with different direction names. The offshoot to Altomünster is also served by Dachau Stadt Railway Station which is much smaller than the main railway station. There are five bus lines which are operated by Stadtwerke Dachau: 719, 720, 722, 724 and 726. There is no tramway transport.

Dachau has a well-developed road infrastructure for regional transportation. The city is connected to Bundesautobahn 8 (via Fürstenfeldbruck) with Munich-Pasing southbound, and westbound terminating in Karlsruhe. Dachau is connected to Bundesautobahn 92 via Oberschleißheim connector which is located east of Dachau. Bundesautobahn 99 is connected with Dachau via Karlsfeld which is located south of Dachau. Bundesstraße No. 471 (via Rothschwaige) connects eastbound towns such as the neighboring city Fürstenfeldbruck and westbound towns such as Oberschleißheim. Bundesstraße No. 304 starts in the south of the city and connects southbound towns until the German-Austrian border. Additionally, several Staatsstraßen connect Dachau with surrounding towns and villages.

== Sights ==
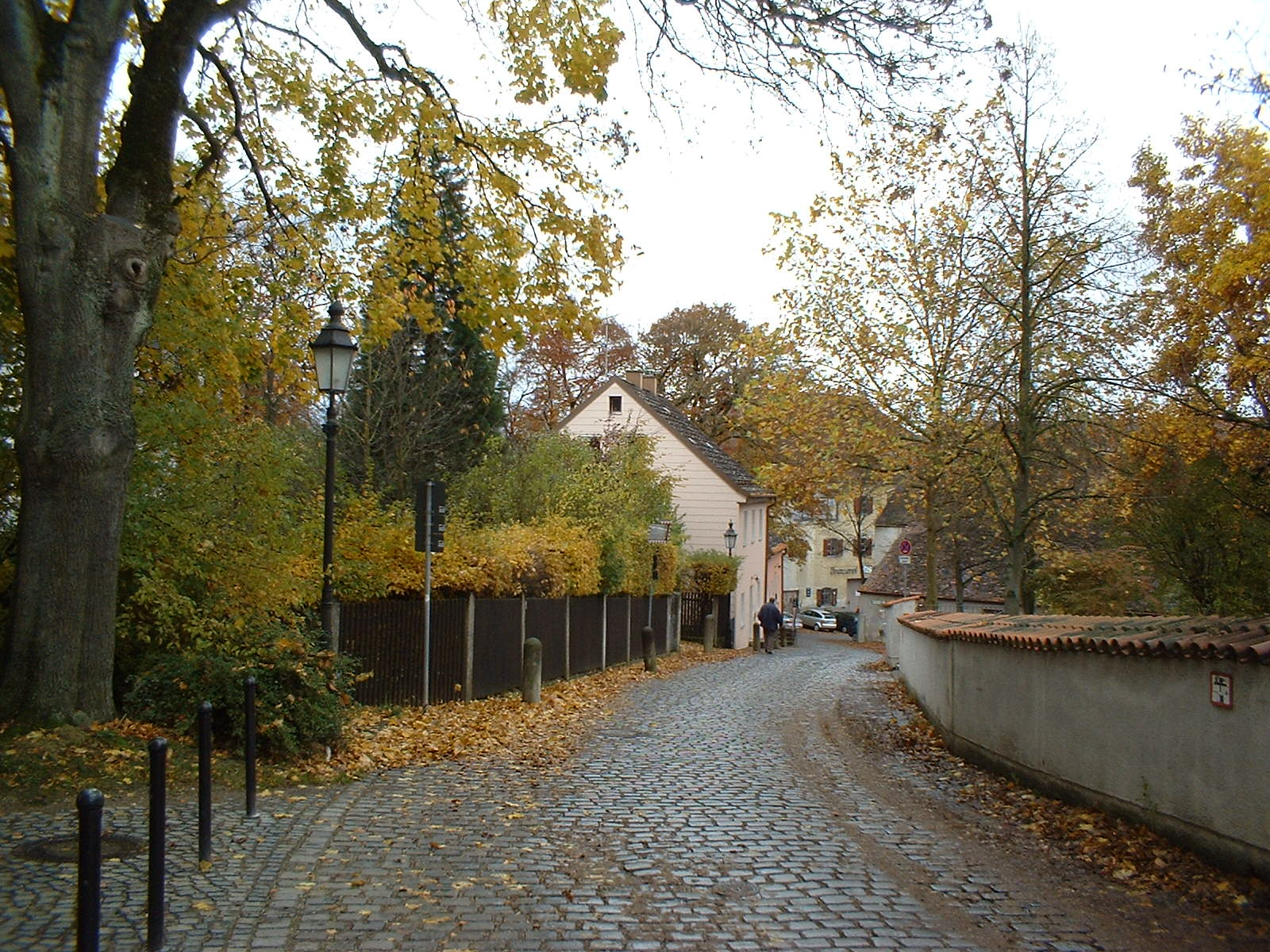
Dachau in fall 2002

- Old town including the Town Hall

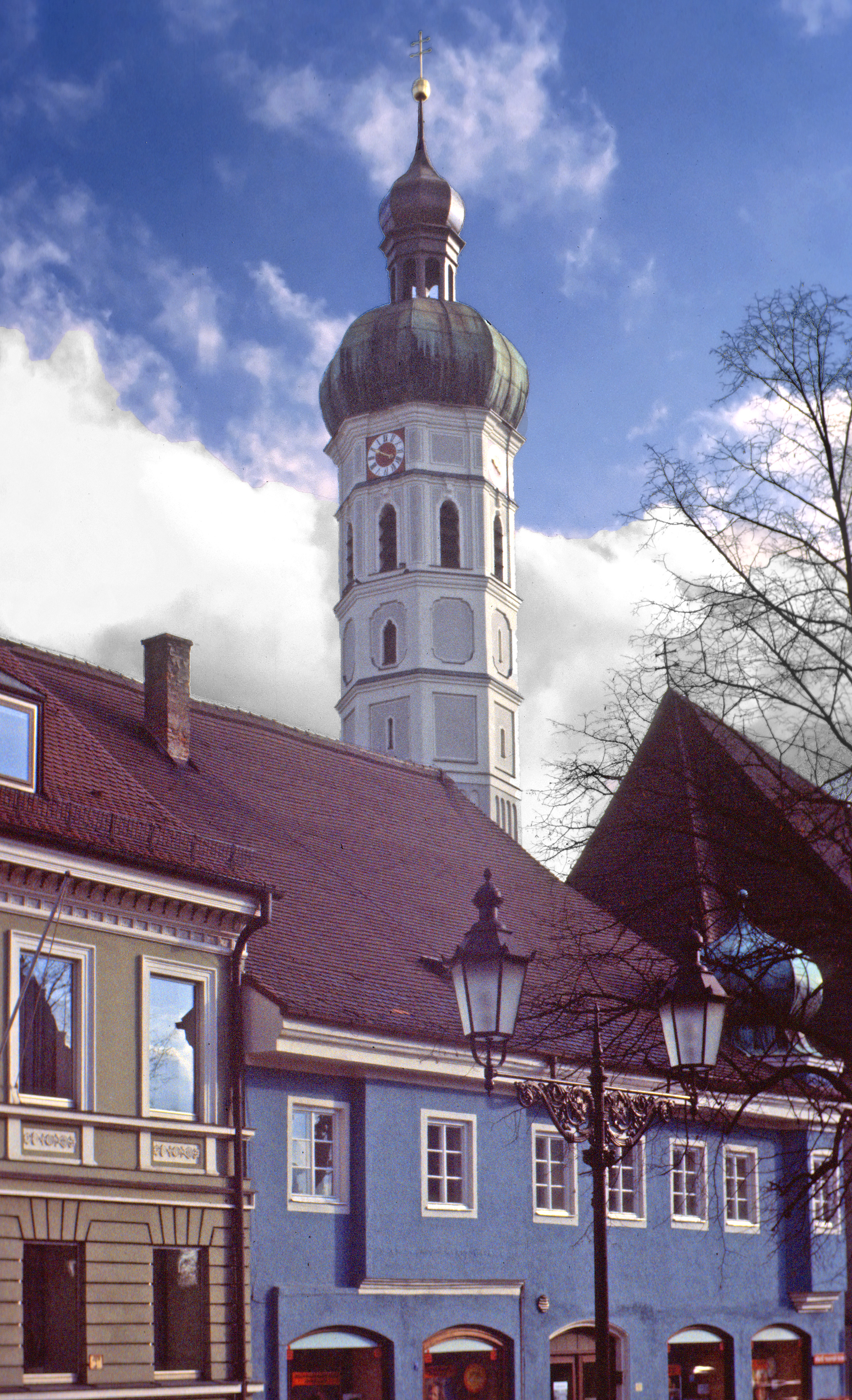
Church of St. Jakob (St. James) -- Dachau 1978

- Church of St. Jakob (St. James), built in the 17th century (Stadtpfarrkirche).
- Church of St. Nicolas and St. Mary, Mitterndorf (1496)
- Dachau Palace and Palace Garden: A medieval castle which became the favorite residence of the Bavarian dukes in the 16th century. It was once renovated into an enormous four-wing complex. Only one wing still exists today.
- Dachau Concentration Camp memorial Site: Dachau is best known for its proximity to the relatively well-preserved site of the infamous Dachau concentration camp, the first large-scale German concentration camp, converted from an old gunpowder factory by the Nazi regime in 1933.
- Dachauer Moos: a wetland area
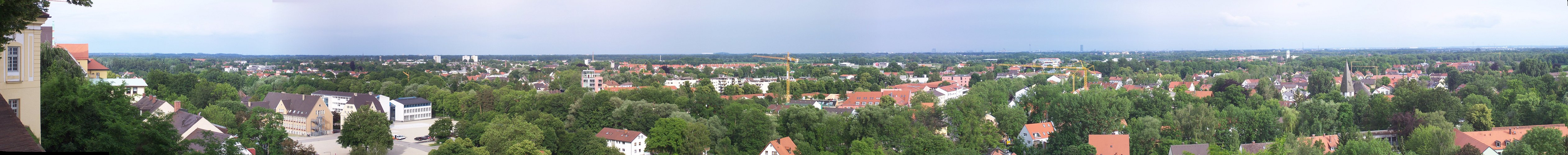
Dachau South

City of Dachau

== Twin-towns – sister-cities ==
Dachau is twinned with:

- Fondi, Italy
- Klagenfurt, Austria

=== Cooperation ===
Dachau also cooperates with:

- Léognan, France; future twin town
- Renkum, Netherlands; cultural cooperation
- Tervuren, Belgium; cultural cooperation
- Areguá, Paraguay; friendship

== Notable people ==
- Hans-Jürgen Bäumler (born 1942), figure-skater and actor
- Efkan Bekiroğlu (born 1995), soccer-player
- Tony Binder (1868–1944), landscape painter
- Lovis Corinth (1858–1925), artist
- Heimito von Doderer (1896–1966), Austrian writer
- Joseph Effner (1687–1745), architect, landscape-architect, and decorator
- Anton Fink (born 1987), soccer-player
- Aloys Fleischmann Sr. (1880–1964), composer and choirmaster
- Josef Goller (1868–1947), glass painter and print-maker
- Thomas Guggeis (born 1993), German conductor
- Christiane Herzog (1936–2000), wife of Roman Herzog
- Roman Herzog (1934–2017), politician (CDU)
- Adolf Hölzel (1853–1934), painter
- Leonhard von Hohenhausen (1788–1872), military and war minister
- Patrick Lindner (born 1960), Volksmusik singer
- Jesse Martin (born 1981), sailor
- Walter Maurer (born 1942), artist, designer and racing driver
- Christian Morgenstern (1871–1914), author and poet
- Sigmund Rascher (1909–1945), concentration-camp-doctor
- Carl Spitzweg (1808–1885), painter
- Ludwig Thoma (1867–1921), author and publisher
- Wilhelm von Thoma (1891–1948), General of the Armored Forces in World War II
- Ernst Toller (1893–1939), playwright
- Egon Zill (1906–1974), Nazi SS concentration camp commandant

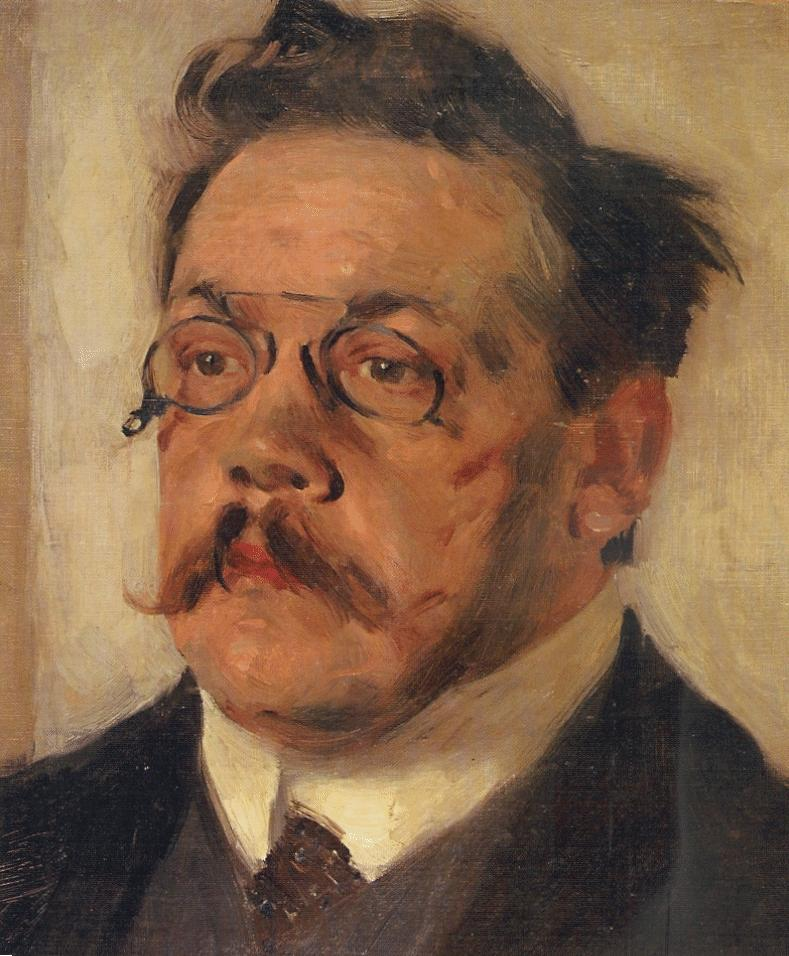
Ludwig Thoma in 1909

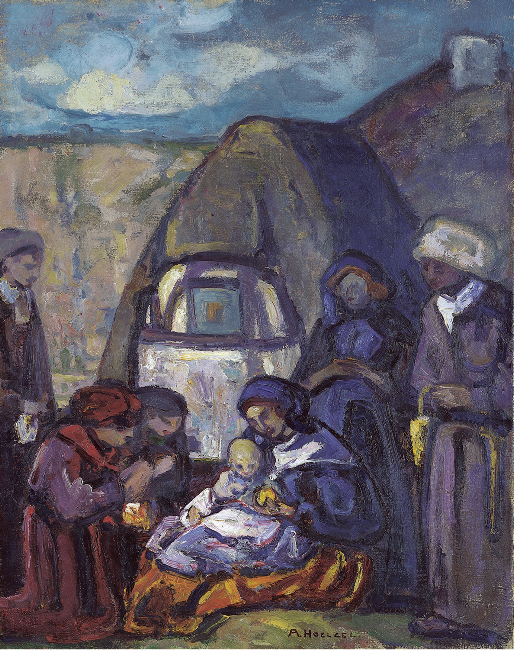
Adolf Hölzel Adoration (1912)

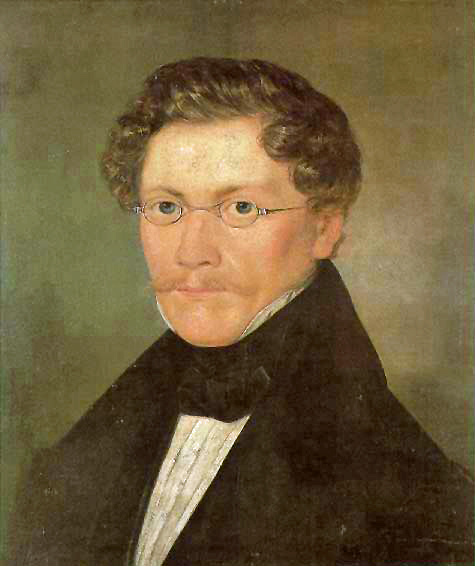
Carl Spitzweg, self-portrait (1840/1842)
