= Hohenester =

Hohenester is a German surname. Notable people with the surname include:

- Amalie Hohenester (1827–1878), German healer and cunning woman
- Hans Hohenester (1917–2001), West German bobsledder
