= Lochholz =

Landscape conservation area in Munich, Germany

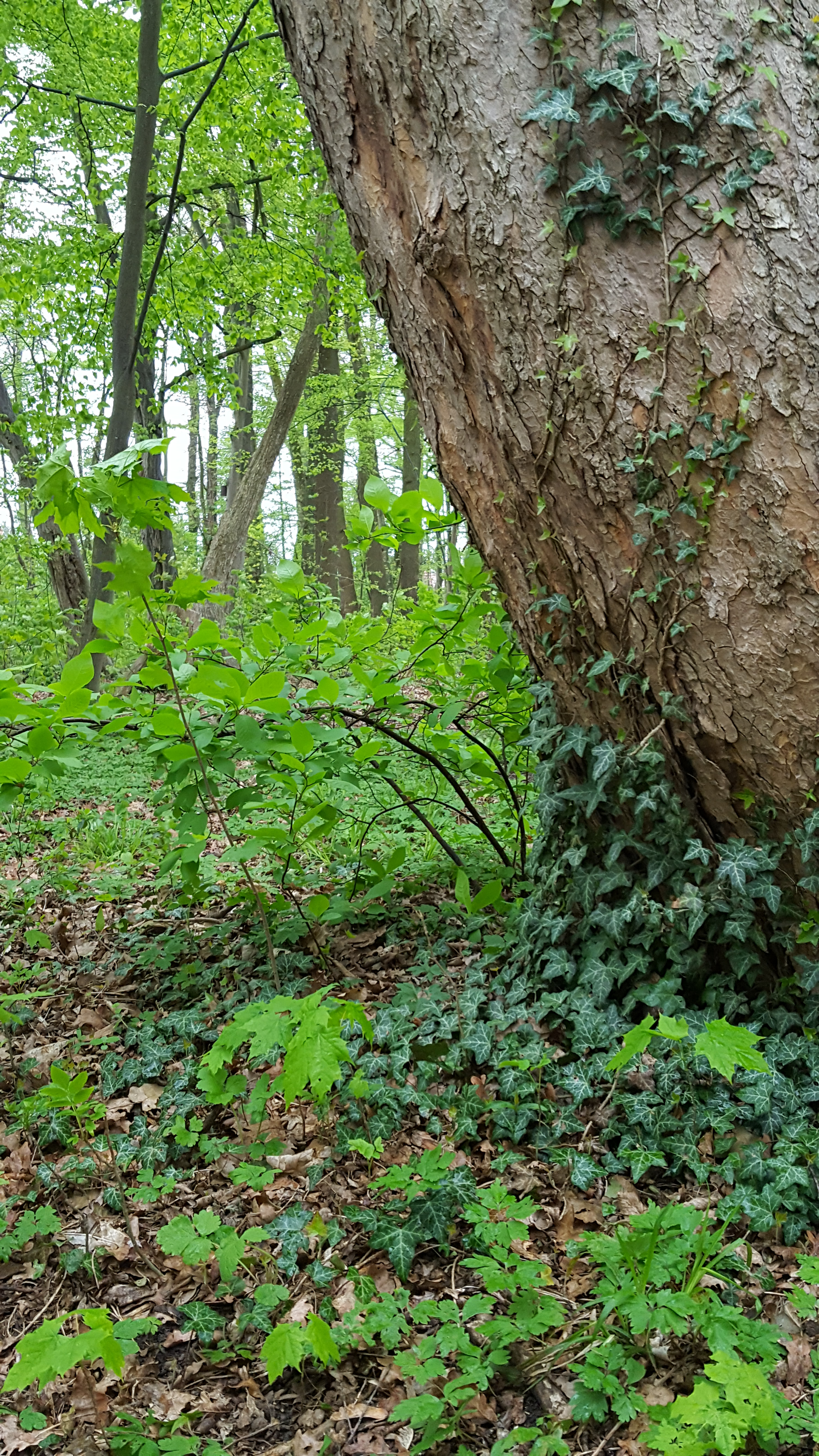
Lochholz landscape conservation area; Closeup of a tree trunk with ivy growth in the forest area

Lochholz is a landscape conservation area in Munich. The area, in the district Allach-Untermenzing, covers 7,13 hectares and was declared a landscape conservation area in 1964. The oak and hornbeam forest is a remnant of the former Lohwaldgürtel north of Munich. Lochholz is part of the KulturGeschichtsPfad Allach-Untermenzing (Munich culture-history path Allach-Untermenzing).

== History ==
Lochholz was a part of the Allach municipality as a community forest. Like all oak and hornbeam forests, the Lochholz was once economically important. Oak bark, the so-called Lohe (tan), was used for the tanning of skins, and from which the name Lo(c)hholz derives. Wood was used for building and as firewood, leaves as litter for the cattle shed. In the course of agricultural reforms of the 18th century, the communal forest was divided. The inhabitants of Allach could now acquire portions of the Lochholz; even today, part of the forest is privately owned. The municipalities own share of 6.67 day work, according to another source 6.02 day work, passed in 1938 with the incorporation of Allachs in the possession of the city of Munich. From the mid-1930s, the Allacher colonization moved into the forest and it was partially built upon. During the Second World War, bunkers and barracks were built in the forest. Displaced persons lived in the barracks after the war. The barracks were demolished and the bunkers filled, but are still recognizable as hills. In 1964, the area was declared a landscape conservation area. In the sense of ecological forestry, forestry intervention is not permitted.

== Protection reasoning ==
The forest is particularly worthy of protection as:

- Retreat area for many birds and rare plants
- Recreation area and adventure world especially for children, including the surrounding kindergartens
- Connecting element between Allacher Forst and Aubinger Lohe
- Groundwater storage and air filters for the environment
- Testimony of the district history
