= Röhrmoos =

- Municipality
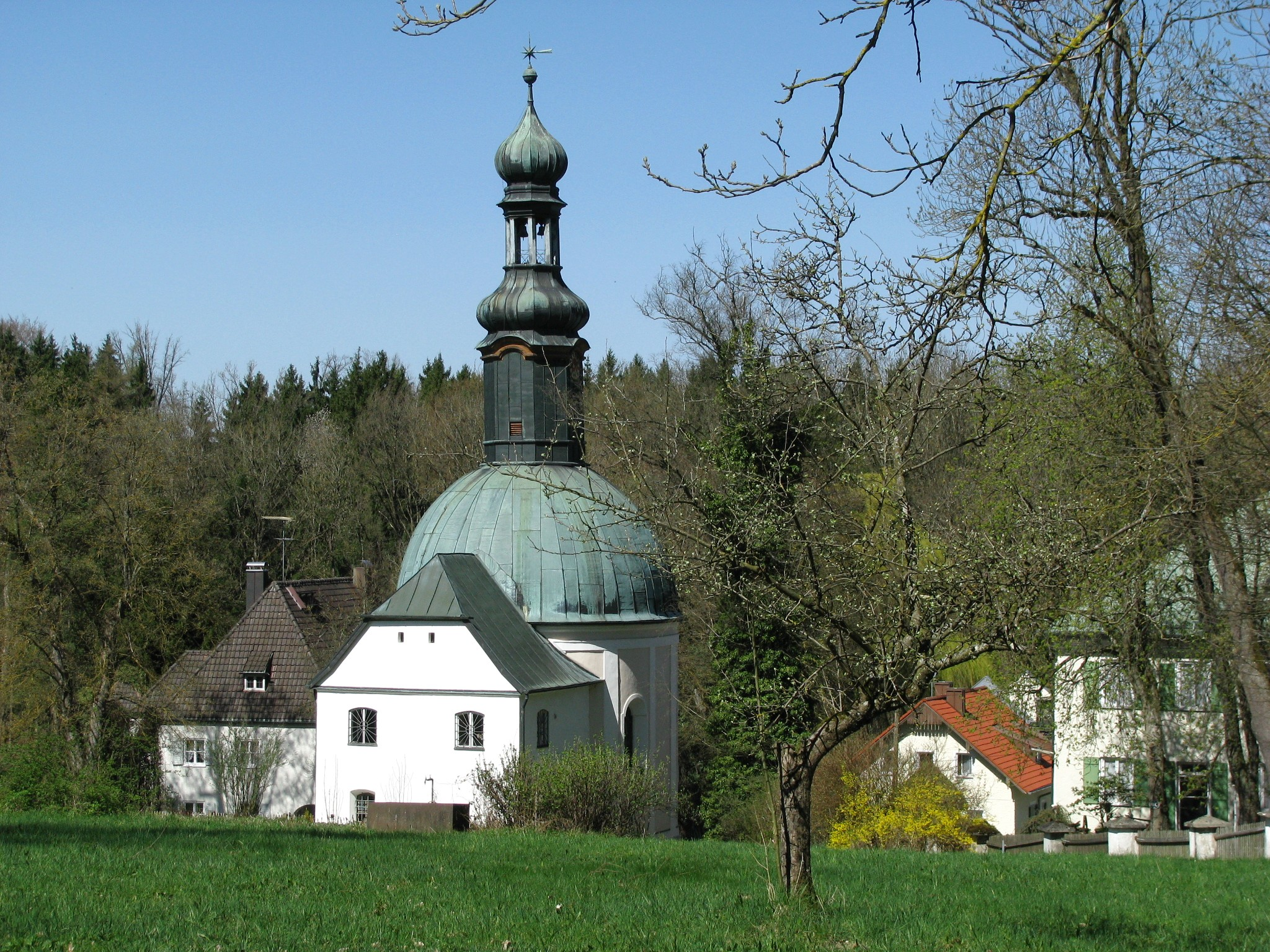
- View of the Mariabrunn village, part of Röhrmoos

- Coat of arms

- Location of Röhrmoos within Dachau district
- Interactive map of Röhrmoos
- Location within Germany Location within Bavaria
- Coordinates: 48°20′N 11°29′E
- Country: Germany
- State: Bavaria
- Admin. region: Oberbayern
- District: Dachau
- Subdivisions: 5 Ortsteile

Government
  - Mayor (2020–26): Dieter Kugler (CSU)

Area
  - Total: 31.74 km^{2} (12.25 sq mi)
- Elevation: 505 m (1,657 ft)

Population (2025-12-31)
  - Total: 6,471
  - Density: 203.9/km^{2} (528.0/sq mi)
- Time zone: UTC+01:00 (CET)
  - Summer (DST): UTC+02:00 (CEST)
- Postal codes: 85244
- Dialling codes: 08139
- Vehicle registration: DAH
- Website: www.roehrmoos.de

Röhrmoos is a municipality in the district of Dachau in Bavaria in Germany. It is located ca. 25 km northwest of Munich. The community is located between the Amper and Glonn valleys.

== History ==
Röhrmoos is first mentioned by name in AD 774. The original name was 'Roraga Mussea' which roughly translates as 'marshy swamp with reeds'. The document of 774 describes a wealthy man named Onolf who owned property in 'Rorage Mussea'. Onolf's son was murdered in a clan feud, so Onolf donated a chapel to the church in Freising to help in the salvation of his son's soul.

A parish church is first recorded in 1424, (St. John the Baptist).

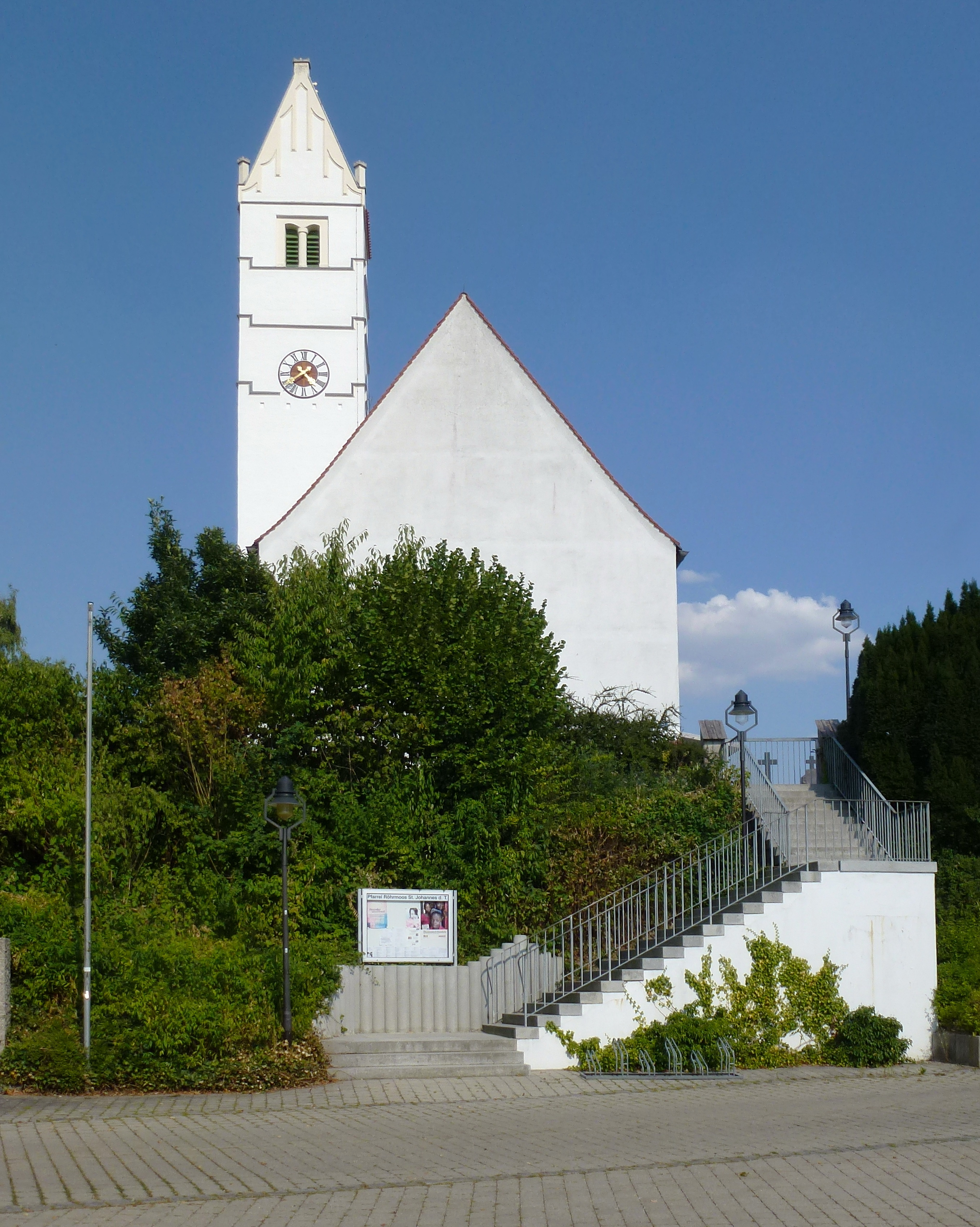
Catholic Church in Röhrmoos

Röhrmoos later became part of the Dachau Regional Court of the Electorate of Bavaria. It then became a municipality in the Bavarian Reforms of 1818.

The first railway between Munich and Ingolstadt was built through Röhrmoos in 1866/67. There was a serious railway accident in Röhrmoos on July 7, 1889 when 10 people were killed.

Near the end of World War II, Allied bombers were seen directly over Röhrmoos on their way to bombing raids over Munich. Units of the U.S. Army passed through Röhrmoos during its Liberation of nearby Dachau Concentration Camp on April 28/29, 1945. After the war, many ethnic Germans from Sudetenland (Czechoslovakia) and other regions of Eastern Europe who were expelled from their homelands settled in the areas around Röhrmoos.

In the 1972 Bavarian regional reforms, several nearby communities joined into the municipality of Röhrmoos.

The 1999 a short scene from the German children's movie Pünktchen und Anton was filmed on a hilly road just outside of Röhrmoos near Schönbrunn. The scene involved a helicopter chase.

== Mariabrunn ==
In 1662 the forested area at Mariabrunn, about 3 Kilometers south-east of Röhrmoos, became a pilgrimage site. After a woodcutter drank from a newly discovered spring, he was miraculously healed of his chronic pain. He attributed his healing to the Virgin Mary and soon other people began to flock to this spring to drink from its waters. The Elector of Bavaria (Ferdinand Maria), ordered a small chapel to be built near the miraculous spring.

In 1863 a Health Spa Resort House was built at Mariabrunn that offered teas, herbs and baths. Amalie Hohenester was active as a healer with her own practice from 1862 onward. Many noble guests visited the Spa including Empress Elisabeth of Austria.

A brewery was built there as well. Today a beer garden is there at the site.

== Schönbrunn ==
Schönbrunn is a nearby village that has its origins from around 800 AD. During the Thirty Years War it is noted in 1632 several people were killed in Schönbrunn. After the war, a palace was built in 1688.

In 1861 the castle was in dire need of renovation and was sold to a local noblewoman, (Countess von Butler). She was committed to the care of disabled people and with the help of the Catholic Church, several Franciscan Sisters moved to Schönbrunn to form a home for the handicapped.

Today the area has expanded as a large institution for the physically and mentally handicapped known as Franziskuswerk Schönbrunn.

In 2015 Schönbrunn opened a refugee camp during the migrant crisis.

== Biberbach ==
Biberbach, a small village just 2 Kilometers east of Röhrmoos, and situated on the Biberbach Creek, has an interesting history. It records the dedication of a church (St. Martin) as early as 740 AD, therefore making it perhaps one of the earliest churches built in the Dachau region. Despite the English translation of Biberbach as “Beaver Creek”, there is no historical refence of beavers ever inhabiting the adjacent creek. The origins of the name stem from the Middle Ages as “Piparpah”.

== Partnership in France ==
Since 1991 the community of Röhrmoos has partnered with the town of Taradeau in southern France. The two partner towns have exchanged visitors and have annual market days in the summer, where visitors from Taradeau (in traditional costumes) sell their products of Wine, Olives, Cheese and Nougat. Visitors from Röhrmoos do a similar market day in Taradeau once a year as well.

== Mayor, Services and Communities ==
The mayor of Röhrmoos is Dieter Kugler (CSU) since 2014.

Much of the community is residential with some agriculture, forestry and some manufacturing businesses. In the nearby Arzbacher Forst there is a 112-meter-high radio tower, which originally served as a relay station for the US military.

The Sportsclub is 'Spielvereinigung Röhrmoos'.

Röhrmoos has 14 local communities:

- Arzbach (originally Arruzzapah)
- Biberbach (originally Piparpah)
- Durchsamsried (originally Urchaim)
- Großinzemoos (originally Inzimos)
- Kleininzemoos
- Mariabrunn (originally Prunna)
- Purtlhof (originallyPurtalahova)
- Riedenzhofen (originally Hruodineshofen)
- Röhrmoos Dorf (Roraga mussea) and Station
- Rudelzhofen (Rudalhouen)
- Schillhofen (originally Shilinhofen)
- Schönbrunn (originally Prunnon)
- Sigmertshausen (originally Sigmaneshusir)
- Zieglberg (originally Zieglstadlpersonal and Jägerhaus)
