= Tony Binder =

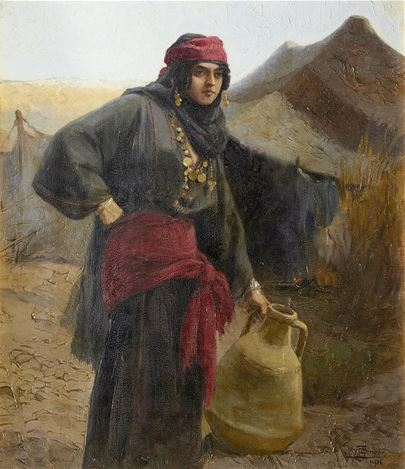
A Berber water carrier

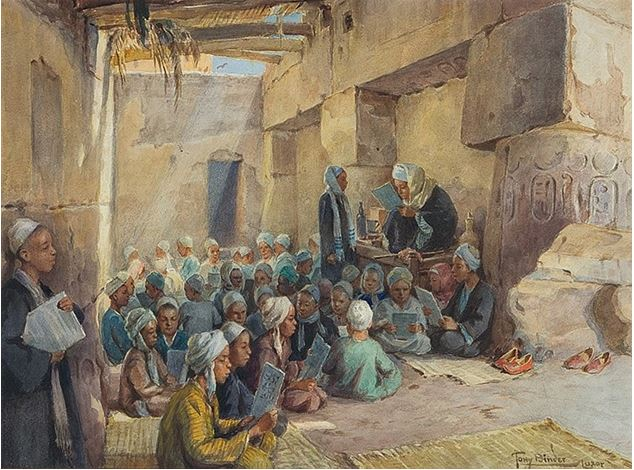
Quranic lesson in Luxor

Anton Binder, known as Tony (25 October 1868, Vienna - 18 January 1944, Nördlingen or Munich) was an Austrian-born Orientalist painter and illustrator.

== Biography ==
He was born out of wedlock, and baptized a Catholic. Information regarding his early artistic career varies, but it is generally believed that he studied in Vienna and Munich, although he may have been self-taught. In 1890, he made a visit to Egypt, to see his older brother, and settled in Cairo.

Four years later, he was living in Istanbul, then returned to Cairo and Alexandria, where he also worked as a photographer. He may have served as a court painter/photographer to the Khedive, Abbas Hilmi II.

In addition to the above places, he probably made several trips to Italy, lived in Greece around 1905/06, and lived in France for a time around 1911. During one of his stays in Vienna, it is believed that he married Mary Reiser, the daughter of one of his photography partners in Alexandria. During World War I, he was in England and was interned in Alexandra Palace as an "enemy Alien" 1915-1918/19. A number of his paintings from Munich are dated 1922, and he held several exhibits at the Glaspalast.

Throughout the 1920s and 1930s, he was present in Luxor, where he painted for tourists and sold copies of his photographs. The Gemäldegalerie Dachau has information that, after 1922, Dachau was his permanent residence.

On his 70th birthday, he was awarded the Goethe Medal. The previous year, he had participated in an exhibition at the Künstlerhaus Salzburg and had been awarded a medal from the city.

In addition to his paintings, he illustrated a few books; notably Ausgraber, Mumienjäger und tote Städte (Excavators, Mummy Hunters and Dead Cities), by the archaeologist, Karl Maria Kaufmann, published in 1928 by August Scherl Verlag in Berlin.
