= Bergkirchen =

- Municipality
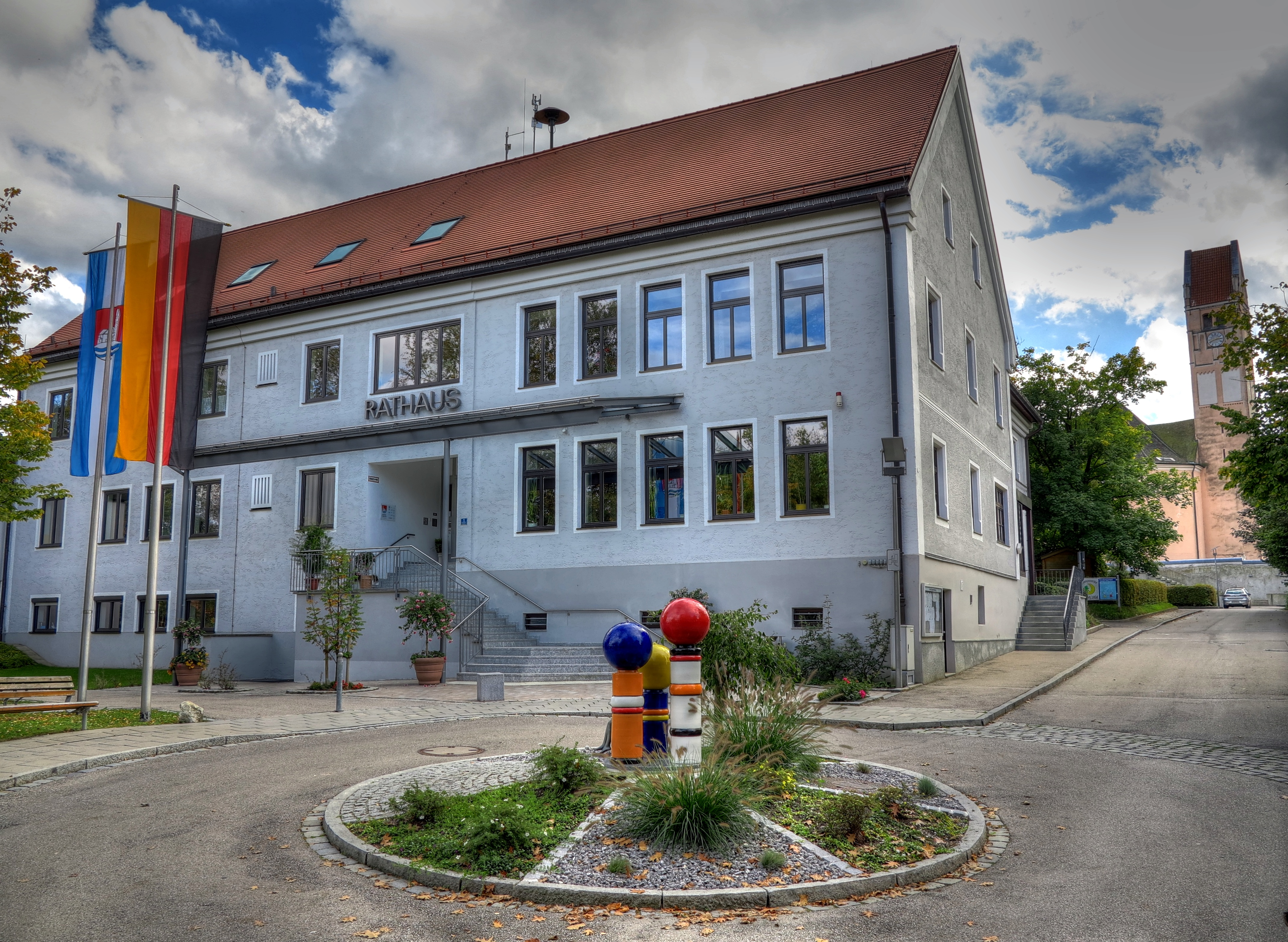
- Town hall

- Coat of arms

- Location of Bergkirchen within Dachau district
- Interactive map of Bergkirchen
- Location within Germany Location within Bavaria
- Coordinates: 48°15′N 11°22′E
- Country: Germany
- State: Bavaria
- Admin. region: Oberbayern
- District: Dachau
- Subdivisions: 26 Ortsteile

Government
  - Mayor (2020–26): Robert Axtner

Area
  - Total: 59.99 km^{2} (23.16 sq mi)
- Elevation: 521 m (1,709 ft)

Population (2025-12-31)
  - Total: 7,636
  - Density: 127.3/km^{2} (329.7/sq mi)
- Time zone: UTC+01:00 (CET)
  - Summer (DST): UTC+02:00 (CEST)
- Postal codes: 85232
- Dialling codes: 08131
- Vehicle registration: DAH
- Website: www.bergkirchen.de

Bergkirchen is a municipality and a village (Pfarrdorf) in the district of Dachau in Bavaria in Germany.
