= Pfaffenhofen an der Glonn =

Pfaffenhofen a.d.Glonn
- Municipality
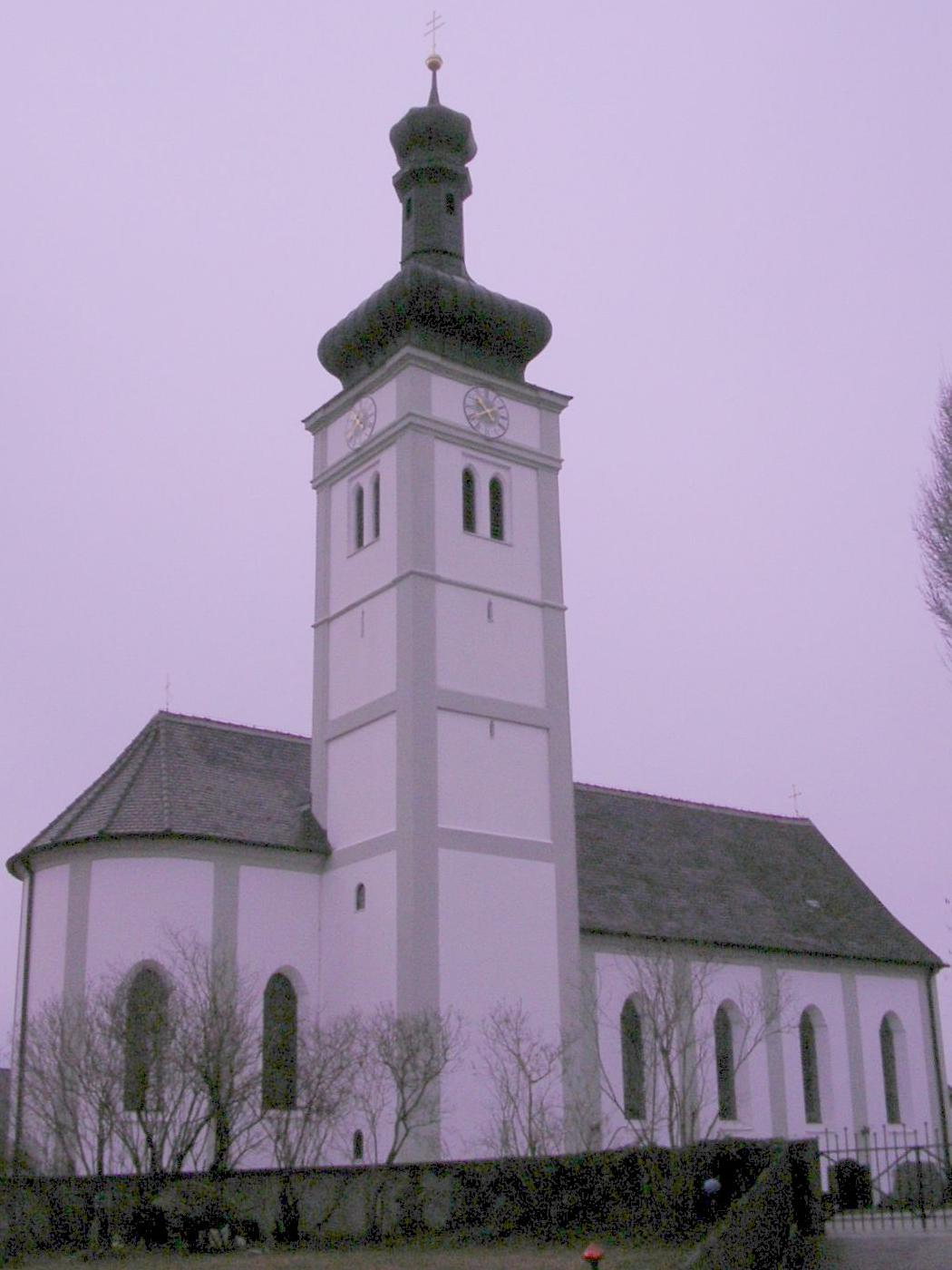
- Saint Michael Church

- Coat of arms

- Location of Pfaffenhofen a.d.Glonn within Dachau district
- Interactive map of Pfaffenhofen a.d.Glonn
- Location within Germany Location within Bavaria
- Coordinates: 48°17′N 11°10′E
- Country: Germany
- State: Bavaria
- Admin. region: Oberbayern
- District: Dachau

Government
  - Mayor (2020–26): Helmut Zech (CSU)

Area
  - Total: 20.90 km^{2} (8.07 sq mi)
- Elevation: 504 m (1,654 ft)

Population (2025-12-31)
  - Total: 2,355
  - Density: 112.7/km^{2} (291.8/sq mi)
- Time zone: UTC+01:00 (CET)
  - Summer (DST): UTC+02:00 (CEST)
- Postal codes: 85235
- Dialling codes: 08134
- Vehicle registration: DAH
- Website: www.pfaffenhofen-glonn.de

Pfaffenhofen an der Glonn (German pronunciation: [pfafn̩ˈhoːfn̩ an deːɐ̯ ˈɡlɔn], lit. 'Pfaffenhofen on the Glonn') is a municipality in the district of Dachau in Bavaria in Germany.
