= Amalie Hohenester =

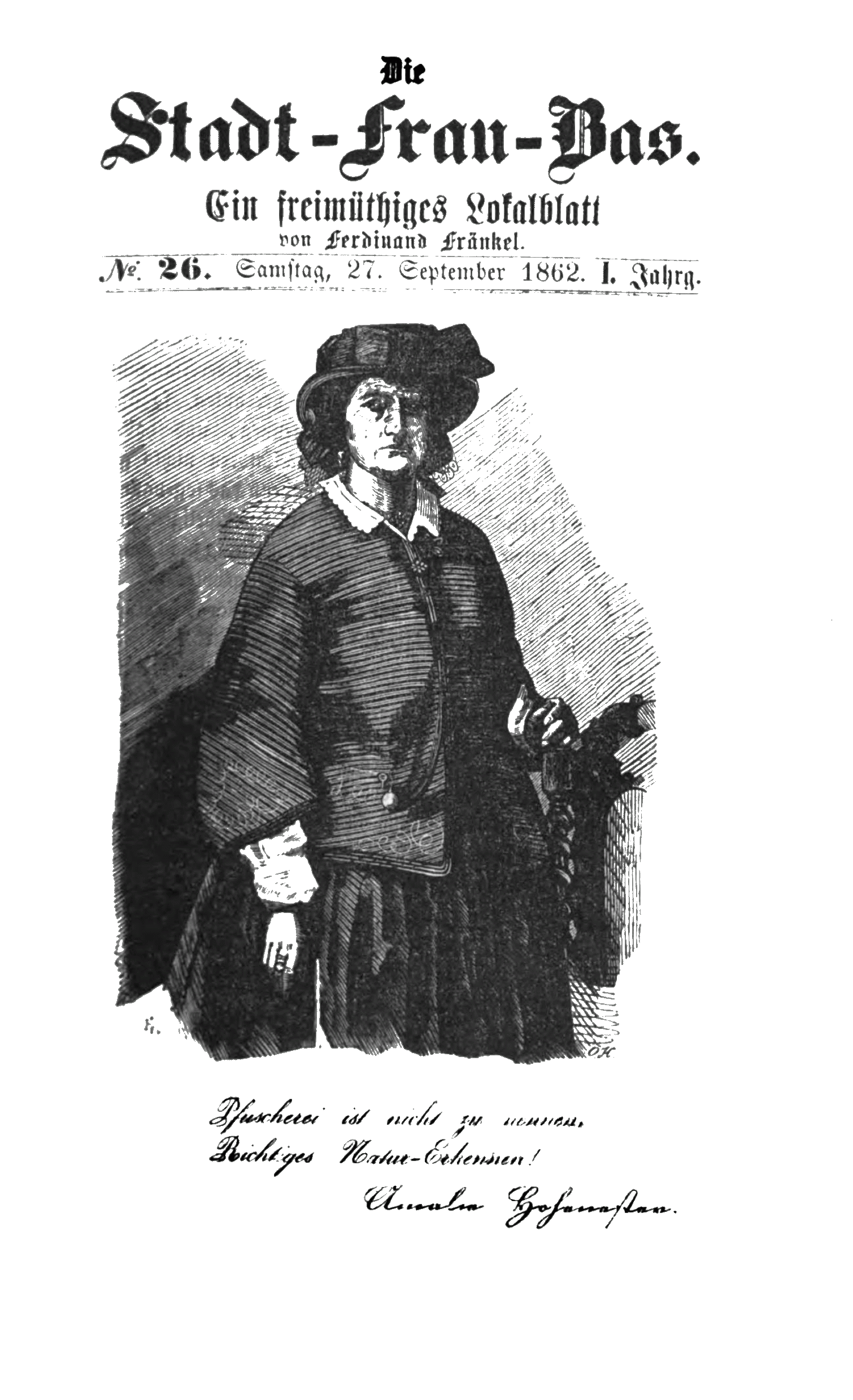
Amalie Hohenester.

Amalie Hohenester (1827–1878) was a German healer and cunning woman. She was active as a healer from the 1850s onward, and managed her own practice, the famous spa of Mariabrunn, from 1862 onward. She enjoyed success and fame, but was also subjected to lawsuits from the authorities for quackery. She is one of the most well-known figures in the history of Bavaria.
