= Dachau (district) =

Coordinates: 48°15′N 11°25′E

- District
- Flag Coat of arms
- Country: Germany
- State: Bavaria
- Adm. region: Upper Bavaria
- Capital: Dachau

Government
  - District admin.: Stefan Löwl (CSU)

Area
  - Total: 579 km^{2} (224 sq mi)

Population (31 December 2025)
  - Total: 154,176
  - Density: 266/km^{2} (690/sq mi)
- Time zone: UTC+01:00 (CET)
  - Summer (DST): UTC+02:00 (CEST)
- Vehicle registration: DAH
- Website: landratsamt-dachau.de

Dachau (German pronunciation: [ˈdaxaʊ]) is a Landkreis (district) in Bavaria, Germany. It is bounded by (from the south and clockwise) the districts of Fürstenfeldbruck, Aichach-Friedberg, Pfaffenhofen, Freising and Munich, and by the city of Munich.

== History ==
The district was established in 1952, with minor territorial adjustments occurring during the administrative reform of 1972.

== Geography ==
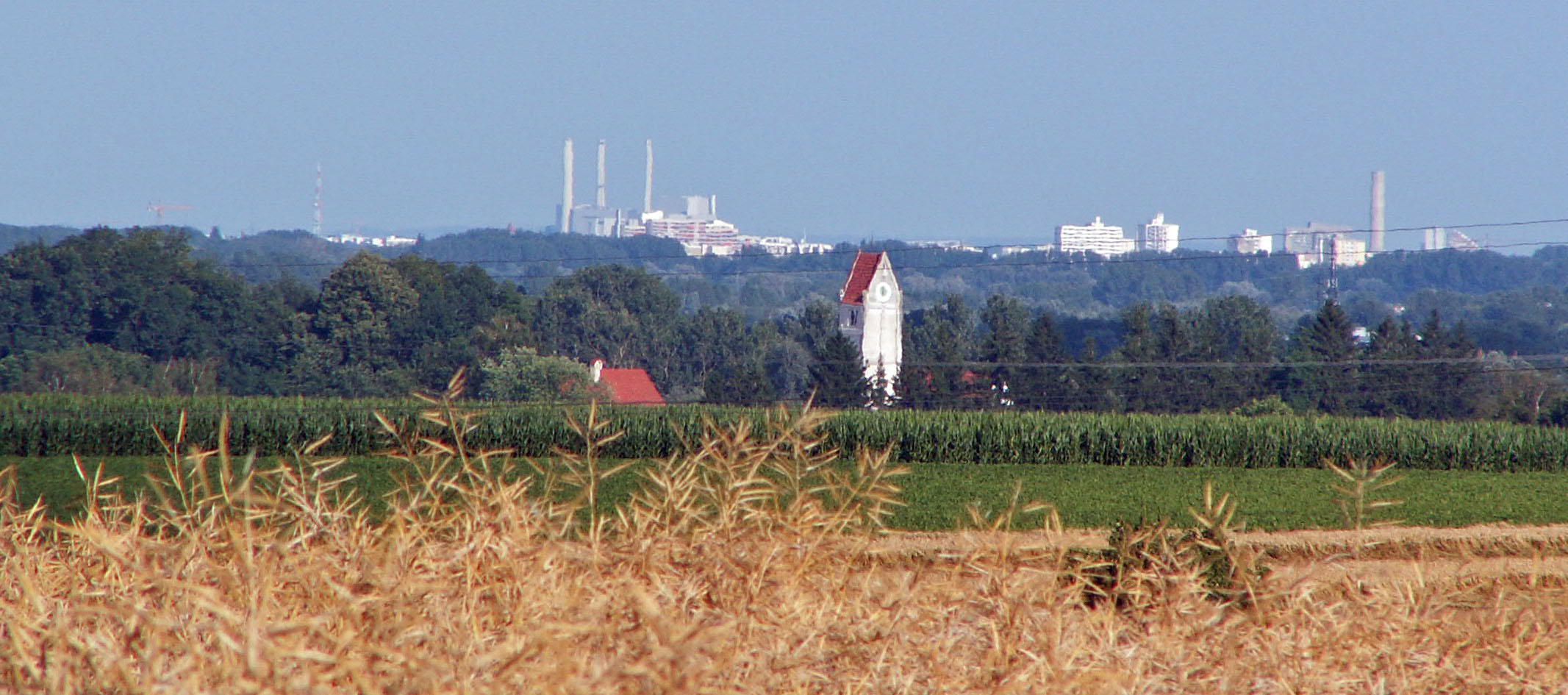
Bergkirchen - Gündinger Höhe - Udlding

The district stretches from the northwestern suburbs of Munich into the area known as Dachauer Land. Characterized by its hilly countryside, the region is now densely populated, with the expanding Munich metropolitan area increasingly encroaching upon its territory.

== Coat of arms ==
The coat of arms features a red zigzag line on a white background, which served as the heraldic symbol of the Wittelsbach family during the 12th and 13th centuries. Despite its discontinuation from the 14th century onwards, this element has been reintegrated into Dachau's coat of arms to symbolize the region's longstanding connection to the Bavarian state. The upper portion of the arms showcases the blue and white checkered pattern characteristic of Bavaria.

== Towns and municipalities ==
Clickable map of towns and municipalities in the district

Towns
1. Dachau
Municipalities
1. Altomünster
2. Bergkirchen
3. Erdweg
4. Haimhausen
5. Hebertshausen
6. Hilgertshausen-Tandern
7. Karlsfeld

8. Markt Indersdorf
9. Odelzhausen
10. Petershausen
11. Pfaffenhofen an der Glonn
12. Röhrmoos
13. Schwabhausen
14. Sulzemoos
15. Vierkirchen
16. Weichs
