= Karlsfeld =

- Municipality
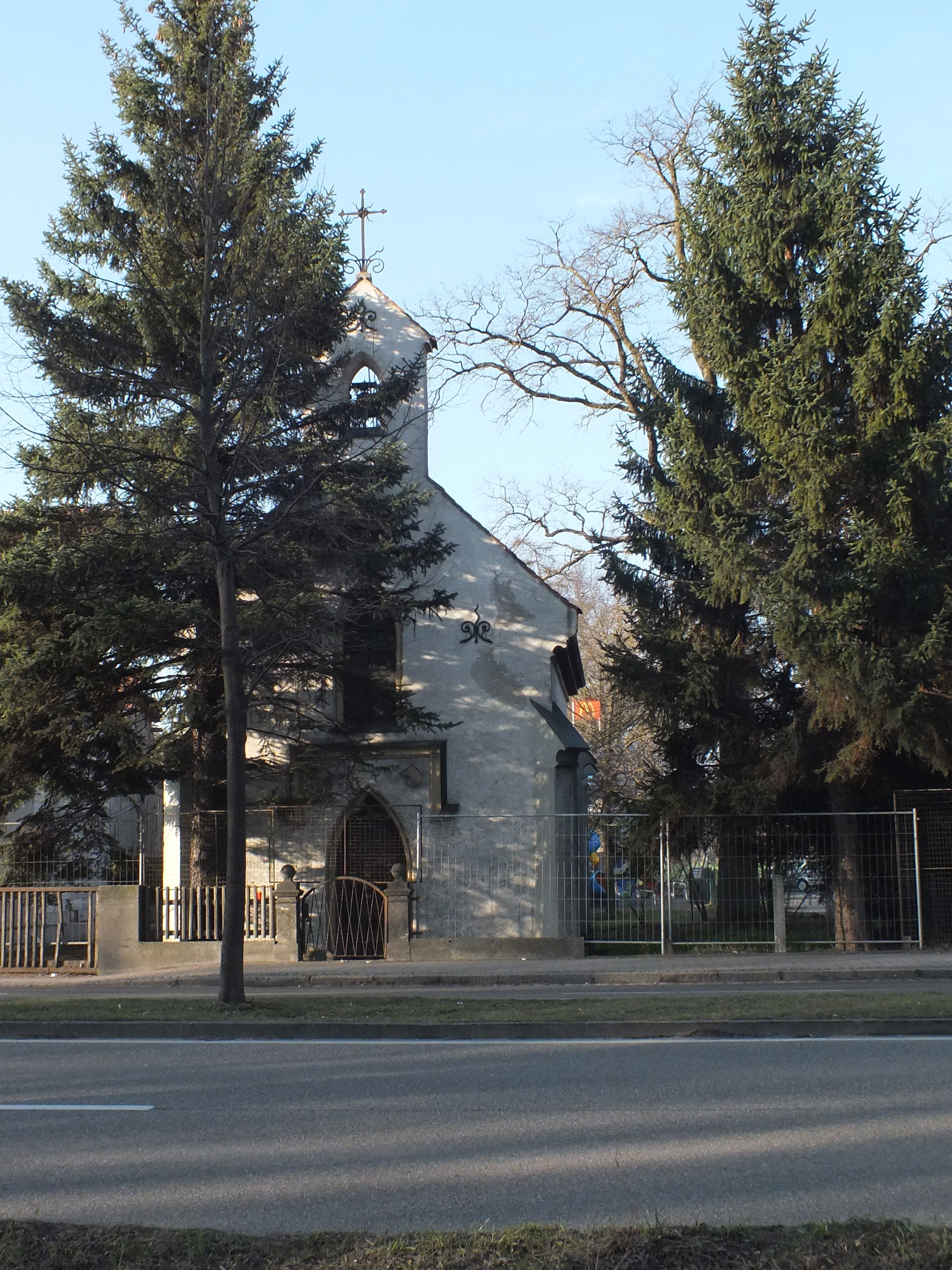
- Ludl Chapel (1900) is one of the oldest still existing buildings in Karlsfeld.

- Coat of arms

- Location of Karlsfeld within Dachau district
- Interactive map of Karlsfeld
- Location within Germany Location within Bavaria
- Coordinates: 48°13′N 11°28′E
- Country: Germany
- State: Bavaria
- Admin. region: Oberbayern
- District: Dachau
- Subdivisions: 4 Ortsteile

Government
  - Mayor (2020–26): Stefan Kolbe (CSU)

Area
  - Total: 15.61 km^{2} (6.03 sq mi)
- Elevation: 491 m (1,611 ft)

Population (2025-12-31)
  - Total: 21,425
  - Density: 1,373/km^{2} (3,555/sq mi)
- Time zone: UTC+01:00 (CET)
  - Summer (DST): UTC+02:00 (CEST)
- Postal codes: 85757
- Dialling codes: 08131
- Vehicle registration: DAH
- Website: www.karlsfeld.de

Karlsfeld (German pronunciation: [ˈkaʁlsfɛlt]) is a municipality in the district of Dachau, and a suburb to Munich in Bavaria, Germany. During World War II, it was the location of a subcamp of Dachau concentration camp.

The municipality is situated 12 km northwest of Munich (centre).

The headquarters of MAN and MTU Aero Engines are located in Munich right on the border to Karlsfeld.

Karlsfeld railway station is served by the Munich S-Bahn on line S2.

== Twin town ==
- Muro Lucano, Italy
