= Aespa (disambiguation) =

Aespa is a South Korean girl group.

Aespa may also refer to:

- Aespa, Rapla County, a small borough in Estonia
- Archivo Español de Arqueología (AEspA), a scientific journal published by the Spanish National Research Council

== See also ==
- Vana-Aespa, formerly part of Aespa, Estonia
- Asbach
- Aspach (disambiguation)
