= Asbach (Petershausen) =

- Ortsteil of Petershausen
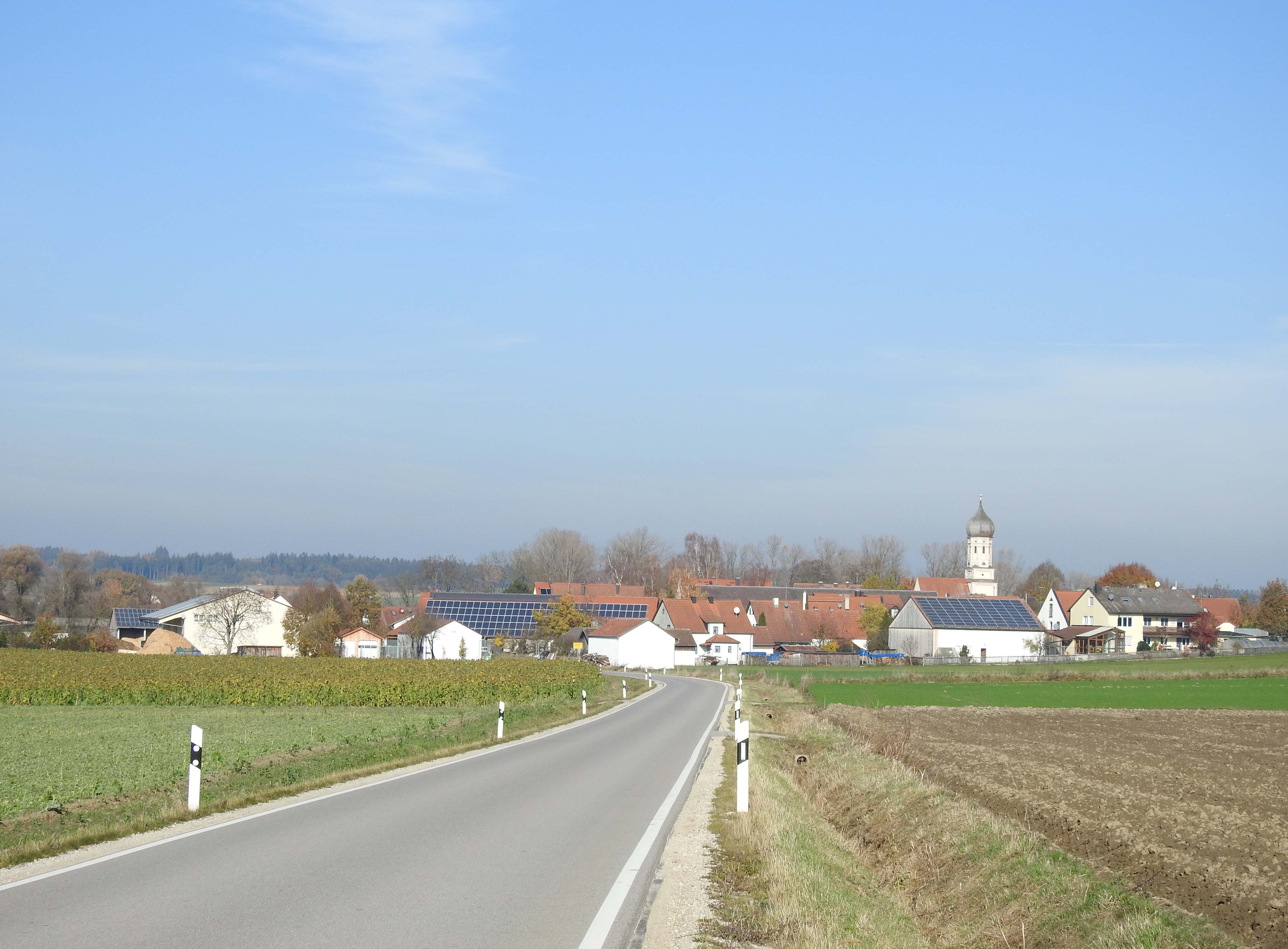
- Asbach from the south
- Interactive map of Asbach
- Location within Germany Location within Bavaria
- Coordinates: 48.392185°N 11.460047°E
- Country: Germany
- State: Bavaria
- District: Dachau
- Municipality: Petershausen
- Time zone: UTC+01:00 (CET)
  - Summer (DST): UTC+02:00 (CEST)

Asbach is a district and Gemarkung of the municipality of Petershausen in the district of Dachau.

== Geography ==
The parish village of Asbach, with approximately 160 inhabitants, lies on the Glonn river between Weichs and Petershausen.

== History ==
View of Asbach Castle and Manor by Michael Wening, around 1700

The Catholic parish church of St. Peter and Paul in Asbach was built in the 13th century and remodeled in the Baroque style around 1715/20. The church was incorporated into the Indersdorf Monastery from 1464 to 1751.

The establishment of municipal self-government was achieved through the Second Municipal Edict in the Kingdom of Bavaria of May 17, 1818. On May 1, 1978, the northeastern part of the municipality of Asbach, including the district of the same name, was incorporated into Petershausen. The southwestern part of Asbach, including the district of Ebersbach, was incorporated into the municipality of Weichs.
