= Asbach =

Asbach may refer to:

== Places in Germany ==
- Asbach, Birkenfeld, in the Birkenfeld district, Rhineland-Palatinate
- Asbach (Verbandsgemeinde), a collective municipality in the Neuwied district, Rhineland-Palatinate
  - Asbach (Westerwald), a local municipality
- Asbach-Sickenberg, in the Eichsfeld district, Thuringia
- Asbach-Bäumenheim, in the Donau-Ries district, Bavaria
- Asbach (Laberweinting), a village in Laberweinting, Straubing-Bogen district, Bavaria
- A locality in Schmalkalden district, Thuringia
- Asbach, Hesse, a district of the municipality Modautal
- Asbach (Petershausen), a district in Petershausen, Dachau, Bavaria

== Other uses ==
- Asbach Uralt, a German brandy

== See also ==
- Aspach (disambiguation)
