= Thelenberg =

- Ortsteil of Asbach (Westerwald)
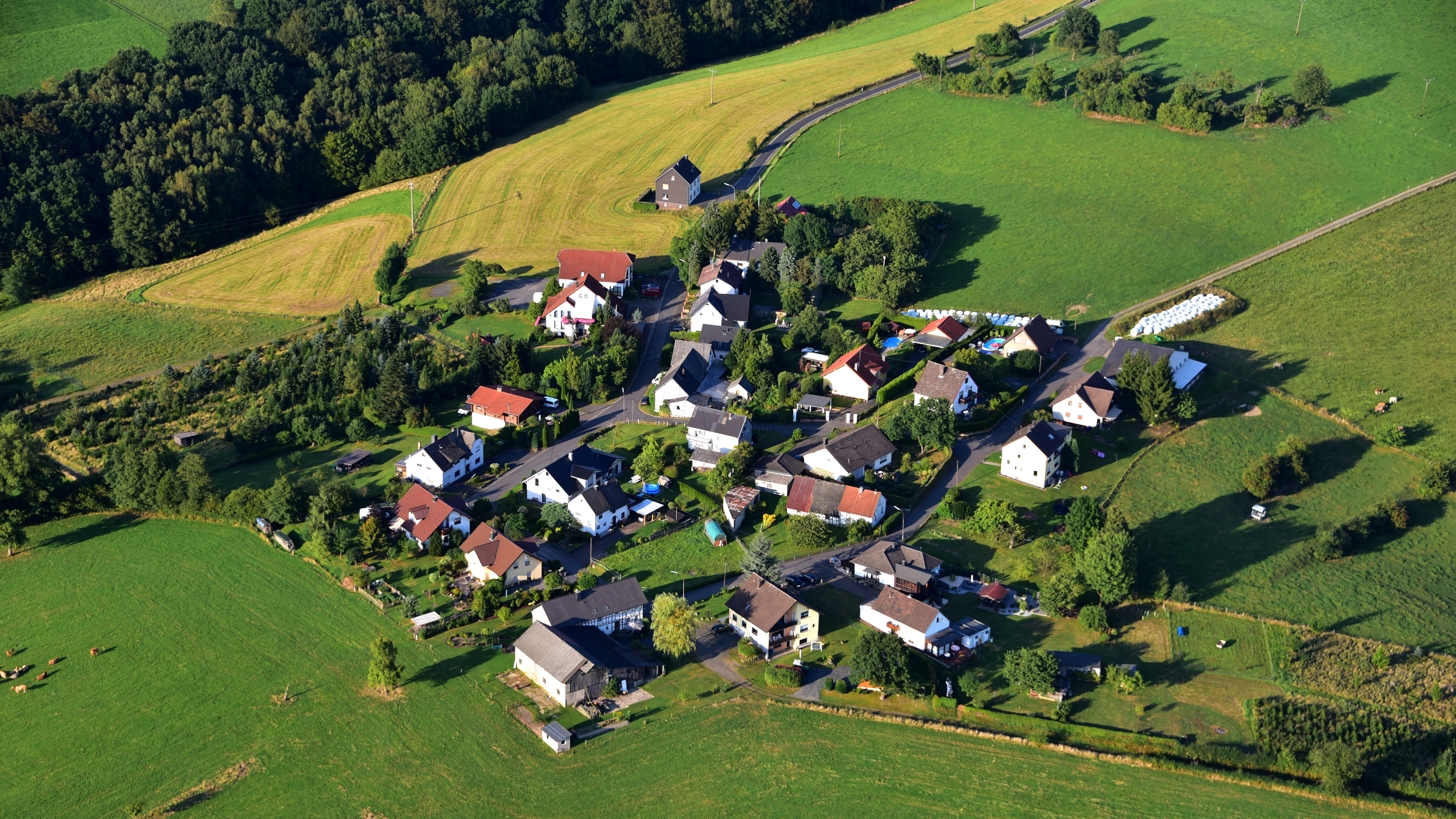
- Thelenberg, 2016 aerial view
- Interactive map of Thelenberg
- Location within Germany Location within Rhineland-Palatinate
- Coordinates: 50°39′20.29″N 7°24′19.25″E
- Country: Germany
- State: Rhineland-Palatinate
- Municipality: Asbach (Westerwald)
- Elevation: 260 m (850 ft)

Population (2009-12-31)
  - Total: 69
- Time zone: UTC+01:00 (CET)
  - Summer (DST): UTC+02:00 (CEST)
- Postal codes: 53567
- Dialling codes: 02683

Thelenberg is a hamlet in the municipality of Asbach in the district of Neuwied in the German state of Rhineland-Palatinate. The village has a rural character, but is increasingly developing into a residential area.

== Geography ==
The village lies in the Lower Westerwald southwest of the main settlement of Asbach on an eminence above and east of the Pfaffenbach stream. Thelenberg is only accessible on the Kreisstraße 41, which links the place to the Landesstraße 255 (Asbach – Neustadt). Within the parish of Thelenberg is the Thelenberg Mill (Thelenberger Mühle) in the Pfaffenbach valley. It is about one kilometre from the village itself.

== History ==
The village name is probably derived from a Frankish settler called Thelo or Thilo. During the Middle Ages, Thelenberg was part of the Electorate of Cologne and Amt of Altenwied and was also part of the Honnschaft of Schöneberg. According to a 1660 survey by the Elector of Cologne, Maximilian Henry, Thelenberg had four farms. In 1787 there were eight houses and 31 inhabitants.

Thelenberg Mill was built in the 18th century as an oil mill and was restored some years ago.

After the Rhineland was annexed by Prussia in 1815, Thelenberg joined the municipality of Schöneberg in the newly created county of Neuwied and was initially managed by the Bürgermeisterei of Neustadt (Wied) and, from 1823, by the Bürgermeisterei of Asbach. According to an 1885 census, Thelenberg had a population of 36, who lived in eight houses. Thelenberg Mill was listed separately with 2 residents.

Until 1974 Thelenberg was part of the hitherto independent municipality of Schöneberg. On 16 March 1974, the municipality of Asbach was reformed from Schöneberg and the simultaneously dissolved municipalities of Asbach and Limbach as well as part of the municipality of Elsaff. In 1987, Thelenberg had a population of 63.

== Sights ==
Under monument conservation are the following:

- A wooden wayside cross dating to the 18th or 19th century
- The Thelenberg Mill, a timber-framed house with outbuildings dating to the 18th century
