= List of sister cities in the United States =

This is a list of sister cities in the United States. Sister cities, known in Europe as town twins, are cities which partner with each other to promote human contact and cultural links, although this partnering is not limited to cities and often includes counties, regions, states and other sub-national entities.

Many jurisdictions work with foreign cities through Sister Cities International, an organization whose goal is to "promote peace through mutual respect, understanding, and cooperation."

== Alabama ==
Athens

- Stonehaven, Scotland, United Kingdom

Birmingham

- Anshan, China
- Aboaso, Ghana
- Guédiawaye, Senegal
- Hitachi, Japan
- Al-Karak, Jordan
- Kingston, Jamaica
- Liverpool, England, United Kingdom
- Maebashi, Japan
- Plzeň, Czech Republic
- Rosh HaAyin, Israel
- Székesfehérvár, Hungary
- Vinnytsia, Ukraine
- Winneba, Ghana

Cullman

- Frankweiler, Germany

Foley

- Hennef, Germany

Huntsville

- Tainan, Taiwan

Mobile

- Ariel, West Bank
- Cockburn, Australia
- Constanța, Romania
- Havana, Cuba
- Ichihara, Japan
- Katowice, Poland
- Málaga, Spain
- Pyeongtaek, South Korea
- Worms, Germany

Montevallo

- Echizen, Japan

Montgomery

- Pietrasanta, Italy

Tuscaloosa

- Narashino, Japan
- Schorndorf, Germany
- Sunyani, Ghana
- Techiman, Ghana

== Alaska ==
Anchorage

- Chitose, Japan
- Darwin, Australia
- Harbin, China
- Incheon, South Korea
- Magadan, Russia
- Tromsø, Norway
- Whitby, England, United Kingdom

Fairbanks

- Erdenet, Mongolia
- Fanano, Italy
- Monbetsu, Japan
- Pune, India
- Tainan, Taiwan
- Yakutsk, Russia

Homer

- Teshio, Japan
- Yelizovo, Russia

Juneau

- Kalibo, Philippines
- Whitehorse, Canada
- Vladivostok, Russia

Kenai

- Akita, Japan

Ketchikan

- Gero, Japan
- Prince Rupert, Canada

Nome

- Provideniya, Russia

Palmer

- Saroma, Japan

Seward

- Obihiro, Japan

Sitka

- Nemuro, Japan

Wasilla

- Uchiko, Japan

== Arkansas ==
Conway

- Quakenbrück, Germany

El Dorado

- Zentsūji, Japan

Fort Smith

- Cisterna di Latina, Italy

Gilbert

- Bride, Isle of Man

Hot Springs

- Hanamaki, Japan

Little Rock

- Caxias do Sul, Brazil
- Changchun, China
- Hanam, South Korea
- Kaohsiung, Taiwan
- Newcastle upon Tyne, England, United Kingdom

North Little Rock

- Uiwang, South Korea

Pine Bluff

- Bandō, Japan

Subiaco

- Subiaco, Australia

== Delaware ==
Bethany Beach

- Périers, France

Rehoboth Beach

- Greve in Chianti, Italy

Wilmington

- Fulda, Germany
- Kalmar, Sweden
- Nemours, France
- Olevano sul Tusciano, Italy
- Osogbo, Nigeria

== District of Columbia ==
Washington, D.C.

- Addis Ababa, Ethiopia
- Ankara, Turkey
- Athens, Greece
- Bangkok, Thailand
- Beijing, China
- Brussels, Belgium
- Dakar, Senegal
- Pretoria, South Africa
- Seoul, South Korea
- San Salvador, El Salvador
- Sunderland, England, United Kingdom
- Tshwane, South Africa

== Georgia ==
Americus

- Miyoshi, Japan

Athens

- Athens, Greece
- Cortona, Italy
- Iași, Romania
- Kamianets-Podilskyi, Ukraine

Atlanta

- Brussels, Belgium
- Bucharest, Romania
- Cotonou, Benin
- Daegu, South Korea
- Fukuoka, Japan
- Lagos, Nigeria
- Montego Bay, Jamaica
- Newcastle upon Tyne, England, United Kingdom
- Nuremberg, Germany
- Olympia, Greece
- Port of Spain, Trinidad and Tobago
- Ra'anana, Israel
- Rio de Janeiro, Brazil
- Salcedo, Dominican Republic
- Taipei, Taiwan
- (Georgia (country)) Tbilisi, Georgia
- Toulouse, France

Augusta

- Biarritz, France
- Takarazuka, Japan

Brunswick

- Ganzhou, China

Chamblee

- Kovel, Ukraine

Cobb County

- Seongdong (Seoul), South Korea

Columbus

- Bistrița, Romania
- Kiryū, Japan
- Taichung, Taiwan
- (Georgia (country)) Zugdidi, Georgia

Dalton

- Dilbeek, Belgium

Decatur

- Boussé, Burkina Faso
- Ouahigouya, Burkina Faso
- Trujillo, Peru

Hinesville

- Marsabit, Kenya
- Yichun, China

LaGrange

- Aso, Japan
- Craigavon, Northern Ireland, United Kingdom
- (Georgia (country)) Poti, Georgia

Lilburn

- Suva Reka, Kosovo

Macon

- Elmina, Ghana
- Kaohsiung, Taiwan
- Kurobe, Japan
- Mâcon, France
- Ulyanovsk, Russia

Marietta

- Heredia, Costa Rica
- Linz am Rhein, Germany

Newnan

- South Ayrshire, Scotland, United Kingdom

Rome

- Kumamoto, Japan

Savannah

- (Georgia (country)) Batumi, Georgia
- Halle, Germany
- Jiujiang, China
- Kaya, Burkina Faso
- Patras, Greece

Tifton

- Linyi, China

== Hawaii ==
Hawaii County

- Cabugao, Philippines
- Gokseong, South Korea
- Hatsukaichi, Japan
- Hualien, Taiwan
- Kumejima, Japan
- Nago, Japan
- Ormoc, Philippines
- Ōshima, Japan
- Réunion, France
- La Serena, Chile
- Shibukawa, Japan
- Sumoto, Japan
- Yurihama, Japan

Honolulu

- Avarua, Cook Islands
- Baguio, Philippines
- Bruyères, France
- Candon, Philippines
- Cebu City, Philippines
- Chengdu, China
- Chigasaki, Japan
- Edogawa (Tokyo), Japan
- Fengxian (Shanghai), China
- Funchal, Portugal
- Fuzhou, China
- Haikou, China
- Hainan, China
- Hiroshima, Japan
- Huế, Vietnam
- Incheon, South Korea
- Kaohsiung, Taiwan
- Laoag, Philippines
- Majuro, Marshall Islands
- Mandaluyong, Philippines
- Manila, Philippines
- Mombasa, Kenya
- Nagaoka, Japan
- Naha, Japan
- Qinhuangdao, China
- Rabat, Morocco
- Rarotonga, Cook Islands
- Sakai, Japan
- Seoul, South Korea
- Shibuya (Tokyo), Japan
- Sintra, Portugal
- Uwajima, Japan
- Vigan, Philippines
- Zhangzhou, China
- Zhongshan, China

Kauai County

- Bangued, Philippines
- Cook, Australia
- Davao City, Philippines
- Ishigaki, Japan
- Iwaki, Japan
- Laoag, Philippines
- Mimasaka, Japan
- Moriyama, Japan
- Ōshima District, Japan
- Papenoo, French Polynesia
- Penghu, Taiwan
- Ponta Delgada, Portugal
- Qinhuangdao, China
- Santa, Philippines
- Suō-Ōshima, Japan
- Urdaneta, Philippines
- Whitby, England, United Kingdom

Maui County

- American Samoa
- Arequipa, Peru
- Bacarra, Philippines
- Badoc, Philippines
- Cabugao, Philippines
- Easter Island, Chile
- Embo, Scotland, United Kingdom
- Fukuyama, Japan
- Funchal, Portugal
- Goyang, South Korea
- Hachijō, Japan
- Manila, Philippines
- Pingtung, Taiwan
- Puerto Princesa, Philippines
- Quezon City, Philippines
- Saipan, Northern Mariana Islands
- San Juan, Philippines
- Santa, Philippines
- Sanya, China
- São Miguel Island, Portugal
- Sarrat, Philippines
- Zambales, Philippines

== Idaho ==
Boise

- Gernika-Lumo, Spain
- Syracuse, United States

Coeur d'Alene

- Cranbrook, Canada

Idaho Falls

- Tōkai, Japan

Ketchum

- Lignano Sabbiadoro, Italy
- Tegernsee, Germany

Moscow

- Villa El Carmen, Nicaragua

Pocatello

- Iwamizawa, Japan
- Kwaremenguel, Burkina Faso

Sun Valley

- Kitzbühel, Austria
- Yamanouchi, Japan

== Indiana ==
Anderson

- Bernburg, Germany
- Yuhang (Hangzhou), China

Bloomington

- Posoltega, Nicaragua
- Santa Clara, Cuba

Carmel

- Cortona, Italy
- Jelgava, Latvia
- Kawachinagano, Japan
- Rueil-Malmaison, France
- Seiffen, Germany
- Visakhapatnam, India

Columbus

- Löhne, Germany
- Miyoshi, Japan
- Pune, India
- Xiangyang, China

Elkhart

- Apan, Mexico
- Burton upon Trent, England, United Kingdom
- Kardzhali, Bulgaria
- Tongxiang, China

Evansville

- Osnabrück, Germany
- Tizimín, Mexico
- Tochigi, Japan

Fishers

- Billericay, England, United Kingdom

Fort Wayne

- Gera, Germany
- Płock, Poland
- Taizhou, China
- Takaoka, Japan

Franklin

- Kuji, Japan

Gary

- Fuxin, China

Goshen

- Bexbach, Germany

Greenfield

- Kakuda, Japan

Hammond

- Galați, Romania
- Shahe, China

Indianapolis

- Campinas, Brazil
- Cologne, Germany
- Hangzhou, China
- Hyderabad, India
- Le Mans, France
- Monza, Italy
- Northamptonshire, England, United Kingdom
- Onitsha, Nigeria
- Piran, Slovenia
- Querétaro City, Mexico
- Taipei, Taiwan

Jasper

- Pfaffenweiler, Germany

Kokomo

- Dongyang, China

La Porte

- Grangemouth, Scotland, United Kingdom

Lafayette

- Longkou, China
- Ōta, Japan

Mishawaka

- Shiojiri, Japan

Muncie

- Changhua, Taiwan
- Deyang, China
- Isparta, Turkey
- Taraz, Kazakhstan
- Zhuji, China

Newburgh

- Newburgh, England, United Kingdom

Noblesville

- Cittadella, Italy
- Nova Prata, Brazil

Richmond

- Unnan, Japan

Shelbyville

- Shizuoka, Japan

South Bend

- Arzberg, Germany
- Częstochowa, Poland
- Guanajuato, Mexico

Terre Haute

- Tajimi, Japan
- Tambov, Russia

Tippecanoe County

- Ōta, Japan

Vincennes

- Ovruch, Ukraine
- Vincennes, France
- Wasserburg am Inn, Germany

Wabash

- Korosten, Ukraine

West Lafayette

- Ōta, Japan

== Iowa ==
Cedar Falls

- Ferizaj, Kosovo

Cedar Rapids

- Tangshan, China

Clarinda

- Tamana, Japan

Council Bluffs

- El Hajeb, Morocco
- Herat, Afghanistan
- Kandahar, Afghanistan
- Karrada (Baghdad), Iraq
- Tobolsk, Russia

Davenport

- (Republic of Ireland) County Carlow, Ireland
- Ilhéus, Brazil
- Kaiserslautern, Germany

Des Moines

- Kōfu, Japan
- Pristina, Kosovo
- Saint-Étienne, France
- Shijiazhuang, China

DeWitt

- Bredstedt, Germany

Dubuque

- Dornbirn, Austria
- Handan, China

Eldridge

- Schönberg, Germany

Elkader

- Mascara, Algeria

Fort Dodge

- Gjakova, Kosovo

Fort Madison

- Prüm, Germany

Johnston

- Peja, Kosovo

Laurens

- Laurens, France

Marshalltown

- Budyonnovsk, Russia
- Minami-Alps, Japan

Mason City

- Montegrotto Terme, Italy

Muscatine

- Drohobych, Ukraine
- Ichikawamisato, Japan
- Kislovodsk, Russia
- Łomża, Poland
- Ludwigslust, Germany
- Ramallah, Palestine
- Zhengding, China

Newton

- Smila, Ukraine
- Wuqi (Taichung), Taiwan

Norwalk

- Vushtrri, Kosovo

Orange City

- Shibata, Japan

Osage

- Lermontov, Russia

Shenandoah

- Tisovec, Slovakia

Sioux City

- Gjilan, Kosovo
- Lake Charles, United States
- Yamanashi, Japan

Storm Lake

- Ayotlán, Mexico

Walcott

- Bredenbek, Germany

Waterloo

- Giessen, Germany

Waverly

- Eisenach, Germany

West Des Moines

- Mateh Asher, Israel

Winterset

- Minami-Alps, Japan

== Kansas ==
Abilene

- Omitama, Japan

Hays

- Santa María de Fe, Paraguay
- Xinzheng, China

Kansas City

- Karlovac, Croatia
- (Republic of Ireland) Limerick, Ireland
- Linz, Austria
- Uruapan, Mexico

Lawrence

- Eutin, Germany
- Hiratsuka, Japan
- Oiniades, Greece
- Tocopilla, Chile

Leavenworth

- Omihachiman, Japan
- Wagga Wagga, Australia

Leawood

- Gezer, Israel
- Yilan, Taiwan

Lindsborg

- Munkfors, Sweden

Manhattan

- Dobřichovice, Czech Republic

Olathe

- Ocotlán, Mexico

Overland Park

- Bietigheim-Bissingen, Germany

Prairie Village

- Dolyna, Ukraine

Shawnee

- Erfurt, Germany
- (Republic of Ireland) Listowel, Ireland
- Pittem, Belgium

Wichita

- Benito Juárez, Mexico
- Kaifeng, China
- Orléans, France
- Tlalnepantla de Baz, Mexico

== Kentucky ==
Bardstown

- Billom, France

Campbellsville

- (Republic of Ireland) Buncrana, Ireland

Danville

- Carrickfergus, Northern Ireland, United Kingdom

Elizabethtown

- Koori, Japan

Frankfort

- Shimamoto, Japan

Georgetown

- Tahara, Japan

Hopkinsville

- Carentan-les-Marais, France

Lexington

- Deauville, France
- (Republic of Ireland) County Kildare, Ireland
- Newmarket, England, United Kingdom
- Shinhidaka, Japan

Louisville

- Adapazarı, Turkey
- Jiujiang, China
- Mainz, Germany
- Montpellier, France
- La Plata, Argentina
- Quito, Ecuador
- Tamale, Ghana

Madison County

- Hokuto, Japan

Morehead

- Ballymena, Northern Ireland, United Kingdom
- Yangshuo, China

Morgantown

- Nanao, Japan

Owensboro

- Nisshin, Japan
- Olomouc, Czech Republic

Paris

- Lamotte-Beuvron, France

Pikeville

- (Republic of Ireland) Dundalk, Ireland

Radcliff

- Munster, Germany

Shelbyville

- Bitburg, Germany

== Louisiana ==
Arnaudville

- Jausiers, France

Baton Rouge

- Aix-en-Provence, France
- Córdoba, Mexico
- Malatya, Turkey
- Taichung, Taiwan

Crowley

- Vaux-sur-Sûre, Belgium

Gonzales

- Meylan, France

Hammond

- Jouars-Pontchartrain, France

Lafayette

- Agnibilékrou, Ivory Coast
- Le Cannet, France
- Centla, Mexico
- Longueuil, Canada
- Moncton, Canada
- Namur, Belgium
- Poitiers, France

Napoleonville

- Pontivy, France

Natchitoches

- La Roque-d'Anthéron, France

New Orleans

- Cap-Haïtien, Haiti
- Caracas, Venezuela
- Durban, South Africa
- Innsbruck, Austria
- Isola del Liri, Italy
- Juan-les-Pins (Antibes), France
- Maracaibo, Venezuela
- Matsue, Japan
- Mérida, Mexico
- Orléans, France
- (Republic of the Congo) Pointe-Noire, Congo
- San Miguel de Tucumán, Argentina
- Tainan, Taiwan
- Tegucigalpa, Honduras

Shreveport

- Ostrava, Czech Republic

St. Martinville

- Bouctouche, Canada
- Chaudfontaine, Belgium
- Gorée, Senegal
- Madawaska, United States

Thibodaux

- Loudun, France

== Minnesota ==
Bloomington

- Izumi, Japan

Brainerd

- Leksand, Sweden

Brooklyn Park

- (The Gambia) Banjul, Gambia
- Kakata, Liberia
- Udu, Nigeria

Cambridge

- Beli Manastir, Croatia
- Rättvik, Sweden
- Yuasa, Japan

Columbia Heights

- Galdogob, Somalia
- Łomianki, Poland

Duluth

- Isumi, Japan
- Petrozavodsk, Russia
- Ranya, Iraq
- Thunder Bay, Canada
- Växjö, Sweden

Elbow Lake

- Flekkefjord, Norway

Fergus Falls

- Nordhordland, Norway

Fridley

- Fourmies, France

Hibbing

- Walsrode, Germany

Lindström

- Tingsryd, Sweden

Little Canada

- Thunder Bay, Canada

Little Falls

- Le Bourget, France

Mankato

- Ungheni, Moldova

Melrose

- Legden, Germany

Minneapolis

- Bosaso, Somalia
- Cuernavaca, Mexico
- Eldoret, Kenya
- Harbin, China
- Ibaraki, Japan
- Kuopio, Finland
- Najaf, Iraq
- Novosibirsk, Russia
- Santiago, Chile
- Tours, France
- Uppsala, Sweden
- Winnipeg, Canada

Montevideo

- Montevideo, Uruguay

New Ulm

- Neu-Ulm, Germany

Paynesville

- Paynesville, Liberia

Red Wing

- Ikata, Japan
- Kongsberg, Norway
- Quzhou, China

Rochester

- Kathmandu, Nepal
- Moosburg an der Isar, Germany
- Siheung, South Korea
- Xianyang, China

Saint Paul

- Changsha, China
- Ciudad Romero (Jiquilisco), El Salvador
- Culiacán, Mexico
- Djibouti City, Djibouti
- George, South Africa
- Manzanillo, Mexico
- Modena, Italy
- Mogadishu, Somalia
- Nagasaki, Japan
- Neuss, Germany
- Novosibirsk, Russia
- Tiberias, Israel

Saint Peter

- Petatlán, Mexico

Scandia

- Les Cayes, Haiti
- Mellerud, Sweden
- Tsukuba, Japan

Shoreview

- Einhausen, Germany

St. Anthony

- Salo, Finland

St. Cloud

- Akita, Japan
- Saint-Cloud, France
- Spalt, Germany

Winona

- Bytów, Poland
- Misato, Japan

Worthington

- Crailsheim, Germany

== Mississippi ==
Biloxi

- Rionegro, Colombia

Clarksdale

- Notodden, Norway

Clinton

- Zarafshon, Uzbekistan

Gulfport

- Rionegro, Colombia

Jackson

- Kahramanmaraş, Turkey
- M'Bour, Senegal

Madison

- Sollefteå, Sweden

Oxford

- Aubigny-sur-Nère, France

== Missouri ==
Cape Girardeau

- Shaoxing, China

Columbia

- Hakusan, Japan
- (Georgia (country)) Kutaisi, Georgia
- Laoshan (Qingdao), China
- Sibiu, Romania
- Suncheon, South Korea

Grandview

- Asbach, Germany

Hermann

- Bad Arolsen, Germany

Independence

- Higashimurayama, Japan

Jefferson City

- Münchberg, Germany

Joplin

- Bethlehem, Palestine

Kansas City

- Arusha, Tanzania
- Freetown, Sierra Leone
- Guadalajara, Mexico
- Kurashiki, Japan
- Morelia, Mexico
- Port Harcourt, Nigeria
- Ramla, Israel
- Seville, Spain
- Tainan, Taiwan
- Xi'an, China
- Yan'an, China

Lee's Summit

- Aizuwakamatsu, Japan

Liberty

- Diekirch, Luxembourg

Neosho

- (Federated States of Micronesia) Pohnpei, Micronesia

Rolla

- Sondershausen, Germany

Springfield

- Isesaki, Japan
- Tlaquepaque, Mexico

St. Charles

- (Republic of Ireland) Carndonagh, Ireland
- Ludwigsburg, Germany

St. James

- Shibata, Japan

St. Louis

- Bologna, Italy
- Bogor, Indonesia
- Brčko, Bosnia and Herzegovina
- (Republic of Ireland) County Donegal, Ireland
- (Republic of Ireland) Galway, Ireland
- Georgetown, Guyana
- Lyon, France
- Nanjing, China
- Rosario, Argentina
- Saint-Louis, Senegal
- Samara, Russia
- San Luis Potosí, Mexico
- Stuttgart, Germany
- Suwa, Japan
- Szczecin, Poland

Washington

- Marbach am Neckar, Germany

== Montana ==
Bozeman

- Mörön, Mongolia

Butte

- Altensteig, Germany
- Bytom, Poland

Great Falls

- Lethbridge, Canada

Helena

- Isla Mujeres, Mexico

Livingston

- Naganohara, Japan

Havre

- Maple Creek, Canada

Missoula

- Neckargemünd, Germany
- Palmerston North, New Zealand

== Nebraska ==
Boys Town

- (Republic of Ireland) Ballymoe, Ireland

Chadron

- Přeštice, Czech Republic

Gering

- Bamyan, Afghanistan

Kearney

- Dourados, Brazil
- Opava, Czech Republic

Lincoln

- Khujand, Tajikistan

O'Neill

- (Republic of Ireland) Blessington, Ireland

Omaha

- Braunschweig, Germany
- Carlentini, Italy
- Isigny-Omaha, France
- (Republic of Ireland) Naas, Ireland
- Shizuoka, Japan
- Šiauliai, Lithuania
- Xalapa, Mexico
- Yantai, China

Scottsbluff

- Bamyan, Afghanistan
- Galați, Romania

Stromsburg

- Ockelbo, Sweden

Wilber

- Telč, Czech Republic

== Nevada ==
Fallon

- (Georgia (country)) Vani, Georgia

Gardnerville

- Osses, France

Las Vegas

- Angeles City, Philippines
- Ansan, South Korea
- Huludao, China
- Phuket, Thailand

Reno

- Hatzor HaGlilit, Israel
- San Sebastián, Spain
- Taichung, Taiwan
- Udon Thani, Thailand
- Wirral, England, United Kingdom

== New Jersey ==
Atlantic City

- Cabourg, France
- Zhanjiang, China

Belmar

- (Republic of Ireland) Balbriggan, Ireland

Bridgeton

- Eskilstuna, Sweden

Elizabeth

- Kitami, Japan

Evesham

- Evesham, England, United Kingdom

Hackettstown

- (Republic of Ireland) Hacketstown, Ireland

Jersey City

- Ahmedabad, India
- Beit Shemesh, Israel
- Changwon, South Korea
- Cusco, Peru
- Gomoa West District, Ghana
- Indrawati, Nepal
- Jerusalem, Israel
- Karpathos, Greece
- Kolkata, India
- Nantong, China
- New Delhi, India
- Oviedo, Spain
- Ozamiz, Philippines
- Palatka, United States
- Saint John's, Antigua and Barbuda
- Sant'Arsenio, Italy

Lakewood

- Bnei Brak, Israel

Lyndhurst

- Kukës, Albania

Marlboro

- Nanto, Japan
- Wujiang (Suzhou), China

Montclair

- Aquilonia, Italy
- Barnet, England, United Kingdom
- Cherepovets, Russia
- Graz, Austria

Newark

- (The Gambia) Banjul, Gambia
- Belo Horizonte, Brazil
- Chunchi, Ecuador
- Cuenca, Ecuador
- Douala, Cameroon
- (The Bahamas) Freeport, Bahamas
- Ganja, Azerbaijan
- Governador Valadares, Brazil
- Kumasi, Ghana
- Luanda, Angola
- Monrovia, Liberia
- Morant Bay, Jamaica
- Porto Alegre, Brazil
- Reserva, Brazil
- Rio de Janeiro, Brazil
- Taoyuan, Taiwan
- Umuaka, Nigeria
- Xuzhou, China

New Brunswick

- Debrecen, Hungary
- Fukui, Japan
- (Republic of Ireland) County Limerick, Ireland
- Tsuruoka, Japan

Paterson

- Ramallah, Palestine
- Sylhet, Bangladesh

Princeton

- Colmar, France

Tewksbury

- Tewkesbury, England, United Kingdom

Toms River

- Matera, Italy

Trenton

- Jundiaí, Brazil

Woodbury

- Bury, England, United Kingdom

== New Mexico ==
Albuquerque

- Alburquerque, Spain
- Ashgabat, Turkmenistan
- Chihuahua, Mexico
- Guadalajara, Mexico
- Helmstedt, Germany
- Hualien, Taiwan
- Kharkiv, Ukraine
- Lanzhou, China
- Lusaka, Zambia
- Rehovot, Israel
- Sasebo, Japan

Angel Fire

- Quảng Trị, Vietnam

Clovis

- Kasama, Zambia

Las Cruces

- Lerdo, Mexico
- Nienburg, Germany

Los Alamos

- Sarov, Russia

Magdalena

- San Pedro de Atacama, Chile

Ruidoso

- Puerto Peñasco, Mexico

Santa Fe

- Bukhara, Uzbekistan
- Hidalgo del Parral, Mexico
- Holguín, Cuba
- Icheon, South Korea
- Livingstone, Zambia
- San Miguel de Allende, Mexico
- Santa Fe, Spain
- Sorrento, Italy
- Tsuyama, Japan
- Zhangjiajie, China

== North Dakota ==
Fargo

- Hamar, Norway
- Martin, Slovakia

Grand Forks

- Sarpsborg, Norway

Minot

- Skien, Norway

== Oklahoma ==
Edmond

- Engels, Russia
- Qingyang, China

Enid

- Kollo, Niger

Norman

- Arezzo, Italy
- Clermont-Ferrand, France
- Colima, Mexico
- Seika, Japan

Oklahoma City

- Haikou, China
- Kigali, Rwanda
- Piura, Peru
- Puebla, Mexico
- Rio de Janeiro, Brazil
- Tainan, Taiwan
- Taipei, Taiwan

Owasso

- Chaumont, France

Pawhuska

- Montauban, France

Ponca City

- Baiyin, China

Shawnee

- Nikaho, Japan

Stillwater

- Gədəbəy, Azerbaijan
- Kameoka, Japan

Tulsa

- Amiens, France
- Beihai, China
- Celle, Germany
- Kaohsiung, Taiwan
- Mwanza, Tanzania
- San Luis Potosí, Mexico
- Tiberias, Israel
- Utsunomiya, Japan
- Zelenograd, Russia

== Oregon ==
Ashland

- Guanajuato, Mexico
- Sviatohirsk, Ukraine

Astoria

- Walldorf, Germany

Aurora

- Bleicherode, Germany

Beaverton

- Birobidzhan, Russia
- Cheonan, South Korea
- Cluses, France
- Gotemba, Japan
- Hsinchu, Taiwan
- Trossingen, Germany

Boring

- Bland, Australia
- Dull, Scotland, United Kingdom

Corvallis

- Gondar, Ethiopia
- Uzhhorod, Ukraine

Eugene

- Irkutsk, Russia
- Jinju, South Korea
- Kakegawa, Japan
- Kathmandu, Nepal

Florence

- Yamagata, Japan

Forest Grove

- Nyūzen, Japan

Grants Pass

- Rubtsovsk, Russia

Gresham

- Ebetsu, Japan
- Owerri, Nigeria
- Sokcho, South Korea

Hillsboro

- Fukuroi, Japan
- Krapkowice, Poland
- Morawica, Poland
- Zabierzów, Poland

Hood River

- Tsuruta, Japan

Klamath Falls

- Rotorua Lakes, New Zealand

Lake Oswego

- Yoshikawa, Japan

Madras

- (Japan) Tōmi, Japa

Medford

- Alba, Italy

Newberg

- Asago, Japan

Newport

- Mombetsu, Japan

Ontario

- Ōsakasayama, Japan

Oregon City

- Tateshina, Japan

Portland

- Ashkelon, Israel
- Bologna, Italy
- Guadalajara, Mexico
- Kaohsiung, Taiwan
- Khabarovsk, Russia
- Mutare, Zimbabwe
- Sapporo, Japan
- Suzhou, China
- Ulsan, South Korea

Roseburg

- Aranda de Duero, Spain
- Kuki, Japan

Salem

- Gimhae, South Korea
- Kawagoe, Japan

The Dalles

- Miyoshi, Japan

== South Carolina ==
Anderson

- Carrickfergus, Northern Ireland, United Kingdom

Charleston

- Doha, Qatar
- Flers, France
- Freetown, Sierra Leone
- Panama City, Panama
- Speightstown, Barbados
- Spoleto, Italy

Clover

- Larne, Northern Ireland, United Kingdom

Columbia

- Accra, Ghana
- Chelyabinsk, Russia
- Cluj-Napoca, Romania
- Kaiserslautern, Germany
- Plovdiv, Bulgaria
- Taichung, Taiwan
- Yibin, China

Greenville

- Bergamo, Italy
- Kortrijk, Belgium

Myrtle Beach

- Keighley, England, United Kingdom
- (Republic of Ireland) Killarney, Ireland
- Pinamar, Argentina

Pendleton

- Stornoway, Scotland, United Kingdom

== South Dakota ==
Rapid City

- Apolda, Germany
- Nikkō, Japan

Sioux Falls

- Newry, Mourne and Down, Northern Ireland, United Kingdom
- Potsdam, Germany

Vermillion

- Ratingen, Germany

== Tennessee ==
Athens

- Isahaya, Japan

Chattanooga

- Accra, Ghana
- Gangneung, South Korea
- Givatayim, Israel
- Hamm, Germany
- Nizhni Tagil, Russia
- Tōno, Japan
- Trostyanets, Ukraine
- Wuxi, China

Clarksville

- Gunpo, South Korea

Franklin

- Bad Soden, Germany
- Carleton Place, Canada
- Ciudad Rodrigo, Spain
- (Republic of Ireland) County Laois, Ireland

Germantown

- Königs Wusterhausen, Germany

Hendersonville

- Tsuru, Japan

Johnson City

- Guaranda, Ecuador
- Ronneby, Sweden
- Rybinsk, Russia
- Teterow, Germany

Knoxville

- Chełm, Poland
- Kaohsiung, Taiwan
- Larissa, Greece
- Muroran, Japan
- Yesan, South Korea

La Vergne

- La Vergne, France

McMinnville

- Mikawa, Japan

Memphis

- (The Gambia) Kanifing, Gambia
- Porretta Terme (Alto Reno Terme), Italy
- Shoham, Israel

Nashville

- Belfast, Northern Ireland, United Kingdom
- Caen, France
- Chengdu, China
- Edmonton, Canada
- Erbil, Iraq
- Magdeburg, Germany
- Mendoza, Argentina
- Taiyuan, China
- Tamworth, Australia

Oak Ridge

- Naka, Japan
- Obninsk, Russia

Smyrna

- Zama, Japan

== Utah ==
Cedar City

- Gapyeong, South Korea

Magna

- Yuzawa, Japan

Midway

- Trubschachen, Switzerland

Murray

- Chiayi, Taiwan

Ogden

- Hof, Germany

Orem

- Ürümqi, China

Park City

- Courchevel, France

Provo

- Meissen, Germany
- Nanning, China

Salt Lake City

- Chernivtsi, Ukraine
- Izhevsk, Russia
- Keelung, Taiwan
- Matsumoto, Japan
- Trujillo, Peru
- Turin, Italy

Sandy

- Piedras Negras, Mexico
- Riesa, Germany

St. George

- Ibigawa, Japan

Tooele

- Kambarka, Russia

West Valley City

- Boca del Río, Mexico
- Nantou, Taiwan

== Virginia ==
Alexandria

- Caen, France
- Dundee, Scotland, United Kingdom
- Gyumri, Armenia
- Helsingborg, Sweden

Arlington County

- Aachen, Germany
- Coyoacan, Mexico
- Ivano-Frankivsk, Ukraine
- Reims, France
- San Miguel, El Salvador

Chesapeake

- Joinville, Brazil

Charlottesville

- Besançon, France
- Pleven, Bulgaria
- Poggio a Caiano, Italy
- Winneba, Ghana

Chesterfield County

- Gravesham, England, United Kingdom

Fairfax County

- Harbin, China
- Keçiören, Turkey
- Songpa (Seoul), South Korea

Fredericksburg

- Este, Italy
- Fréjus, France
- Kathmandu, Nepal
- Princes Town, Ghana
- Schwetzingen, Germany

Gordonsville

- Thoré-la-Rochette, France

Hampton

- Anyang, South Korea
- Malanje, Angola
- Msunduzi, South Africa
- Southampton, England, United Kingdom
- Vendôme, France

Herndon

- Runnymede, England, United Kingdom

Hopewell

- Ashford, England, United Kingdom

Jamestown

- Lyme Regis, England, United Kingdom
- St. George's, Bermuda

Leesburg

- Samcheok, South Korea

Lexington

- Chortkiv, Ukraine

Loudoun County

- Canelones, Uruguay
- Goyang, South Korea
- Greater Noida, India
- Holmes County, United States
- Karşıyaka, Turkey
- Main-Taunus (district), Germany
- New Taipei, Taiwan
- Tema, Ghana

Lynchburg

- Glauchau, Germany

Newport News

- (Republic of Ireland) Carrigaline, Ireland
- Greifswald, Germany
- Neyagawa, Japan
- Taizhou, China
- Vorpommern, Germany
- Ziyang City, China

Norfolk

- Cagayan de Oro, Philippines
- Halifax, Canada
- Kaliningrad, Russia
- Kitakyushu, Japan
- Kochi, India
- Norfolk, England, United Kingdom
- Tema, Ghana
- Toulon, France
- Wilhelmshaven, Germany

Portsmouth

- Dunedin, New Zealand
- Eldoret, Kenya
- Portsmouth, England, United Kingdom

Richmond

- Olsztyn, Poland
- Richmond upon Thames, England, United Kingdom
- Saitama, Japan
- Ségou, Mali
- Windhoek, Namibia
- Zhengzhou, China

Roanoke

- Florianópolis, Brazil
- Kisumu, Kenya
- Lijiang, China
- Opole, Poland
- Saint-Lô, France
- Wonju, South Korea

Stafford County

- Stafford, England, United Kingdom

Staunton

- Viseu de Sus, Romania

Suffolk

- Oderzo, Italy
- Suffolk, England, United Kingdom

Virginia Beach

- Ards and North Down, Northern Ireland, United Kingdom
- Miyazaki, Japan
- Moss, Norway
- Olongapo, Philippines
- San Juan del Sur, Nicaragua
- Waiblingen, Germany

Wise

- Çeşme, Turkey

Yorktown

- Port-Vendres, France
- Zweibrücken, Germany

== West Virginia ==
Charleston

- Banská Bystrica, Slovakia

Harpers Ferry

- Chatham-Kent, Canada

Morgantown

- Guanajuato, Mexico
- Quanshan (Xuzhou), China

Princeton

- Yoshkar-Ola, Russia

== Wisconsin ==
Appleton

- Chinandega, Nicaragua
- Kanonji, Japan
- Kurgan, Russia

Ashland

- Takaishi, Japan

Beloit

- Masaya, Nicaragua
- Pinerolo, Italy

Brookfield

- Seligenstadt, Germany

Burlington

- Diriamba, Nicaragua

Clintonville

- Boaco, Nicaragua

Crivitz

- Crivitz, Germany

Dane County

- Clwyd, Wales, United Kingdom

De Pere

- Åmål, Sweden
- Xuzhou, China

Dodgeville

- Oakham, England, United Kingdom

Door County

- Jingdezhen, China

Eau Claire

- Lismore, Australia

Fond du Lac

- Waspam, Nicaragua

Fort Atkinson

- Puerto Cabezas, Nicaragua

Green Bay

- Delft, Netherlands
- Irapuato, Mexico

Hayward

- Lillehammer, Norway

Horicon

- Senonches, France

Janesville

- León, Nicaragua

Kenosha

- Cosenza, Italy
- Douai, France
- Quezon City, Philippines
- Wolfenbüttel, Germany

La Crosse

- (Republic of Ireland) Bantry, Ireland
- Dubna, Russia
- Épinal, France
- Førde, Norway
- Friedberg, Germany
- Junglinster, Luxembourg
- Kumba, Cameroon
- Luoyang, China

Madison

- (Timor-Leste) Ainaro, East Timor (inactive)
- Arcatao, El Salvador
- Bắc Giang, Vietnam (inactive)
- Bahir Dar, Ethiopia
- Camagüey, Cuba
- Cusco, Peru
- Freiburg im Breisgau, Germany
- (The Gambia) Kanifing, Gambia
- Managua, Nicaragua (inactive)
- Mantua, Italy
- Obihiro, Japan
- Oslo, Norway (inactive)
- Tepatitlán de Morelos, Mexico
- Vilnius, Lithuania

Manitowoc

- Kamogawa, Japan
- Xindian District, Taiwan

Marshfield

- Jáuregui, Argentina
- Zhangjiagang, China

Menasha

- Maebashi, Japan

Menomonie

- Konakovo, Russia
- Nasukarasuyama, Japan

Middleton

- Pearl Lagoon, Nicaragua

Milwaukee

- Abuja, Nigeria
- Bomet, Kenya
- (Republic of Ireland) Galway, Ireland
- Irpin, Ukraine
- Kragujevac, Serbia
- Omsk, Russia
- Schwerin, Germany
- Tarime District, Tanzania
- Zadar, Croatia

Milwaukee County

- Białystok, Poland
- Qonce, South Africa

Mineral Point

- Redruth, England, United Kingdom

New Berlin

- Jinotega, Nicaragua

New London

- (Republic of Ireland) Killaloe, Ireland

Oconomowoc

- Corinto, Nicaragua
- Dietzenbach, Germany

Poplar

- Madang, Papua New Guinea

Port Washington

- Sassnitz, Germany

Racine

- Aalborg, Denmark
- Bluefields, Nicaragua (inactive)
- Fortaleza, Brazil (inactive)
- Montélimar, France
- Ōiso, Japan
- Zapotlanejo, Mexico

Rice Lake

- Miharu, Japan
- Žamberk, Czech Republic

Richland Center

- Santa Teresa, Nicaragua
- Yueqing, China

Sheboygan

- Esslingen am Neckar, Germany
- Rivas, Nicaragua
- Tsubame, Japan

Stevens Point

- Esteli, Nicaragua
- Gulcz (Wieleń), Poland
- Rostov, Russia

Stoughton

- Gjøvik, Norway

Superior

- Ami, Japan

Two Rivers

- Domažlice, Czech Republic

Viroqua

- Taldom, Russia

Watertown

- Uherský Brod, Czech Republic

Waukesha

- Granada, Nicaragua
- Kokshetau, Kazakhstan

Waupaca

- Rødding, Denmark
- Mitoyo, Japan

Wausau

- Siping, China

West Bend

- Aishō, Japan
- Heppenheim, Germany
- Pazardzhik, Bulgaria

Whitewater

- El Rama, Nicaragua

Wisconsin Dells

- Iwaizumi, Japan

== Wyoming ==
Cheyenne

- Accra, Ghana
- Bismarck, United States
- Hammam Sousse, Tunisia
- Lompoc, United States
- Voghera, Italy
- Taichung, Taiwan
- Waimea, United States

Gillette

- Yulin, China

Jackson

- Lienz, Austria
