= Hallerbach =

Hallerbach may refer to:

- Hallerbach (Windhagen), a locality in the municipality Windhagen in Rhineland-Palatinate, Germany
- Hallerbach (Holtebach), a river of North Rhine-Westphalia, Germany
