= Tegernbach (Mittelstetten) =

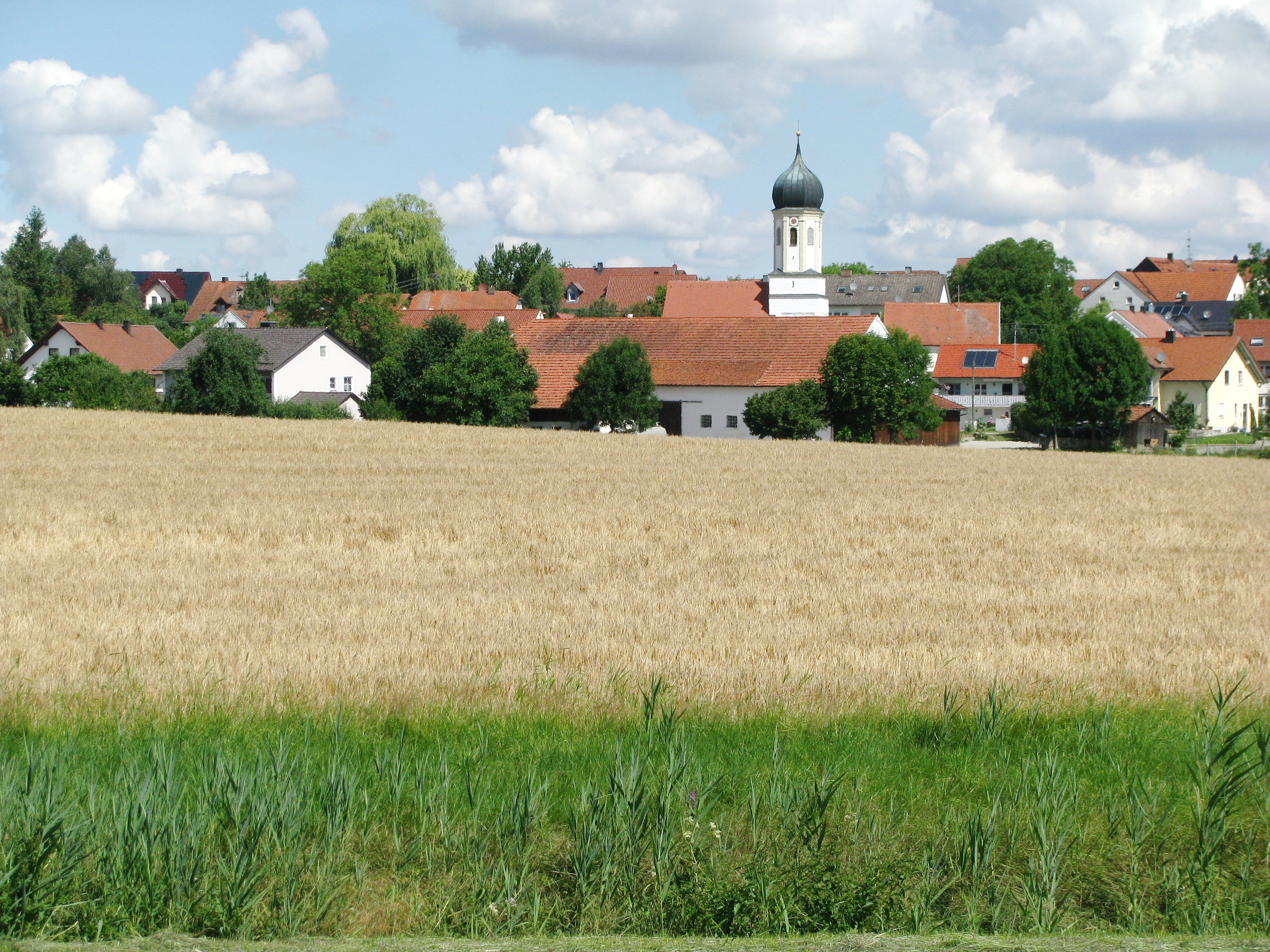

Tegernbach is a district of the municipality of Mittelstetten in the Upper Bavarian district of Fürstenfeldbruck in Germany. The church village is located about two kilometers northwest of Mittelstetten.

== History ==
Duke Welf VI gave 1147 to his foundation of the Steingaden Abbey among other things also courts in Tegernbach. In 1331 a Burgstall is mentioned in the village, which was owned by the Fürstenfeld Abbey.
