= Rederscheid =

Village in Rhineland-Palatinate, Germany

Coordinates: 50°38′N 7°20′E

Rederscheid is a town in the municipality of Windhagen in the district of Neuwied, Rhineland-Palatinate, Germany. As of 2022, the town has 728 inhabitants.

Rederscheid was incorporated into Windhagen on November 8, 1970. In April 2022, seventy refugees from the Russian invasion of Ukraine were housed in a former hotel in the town. The town includes a playground and village square.
