= Glonn (Amper) =

River in Bavaria, Germany

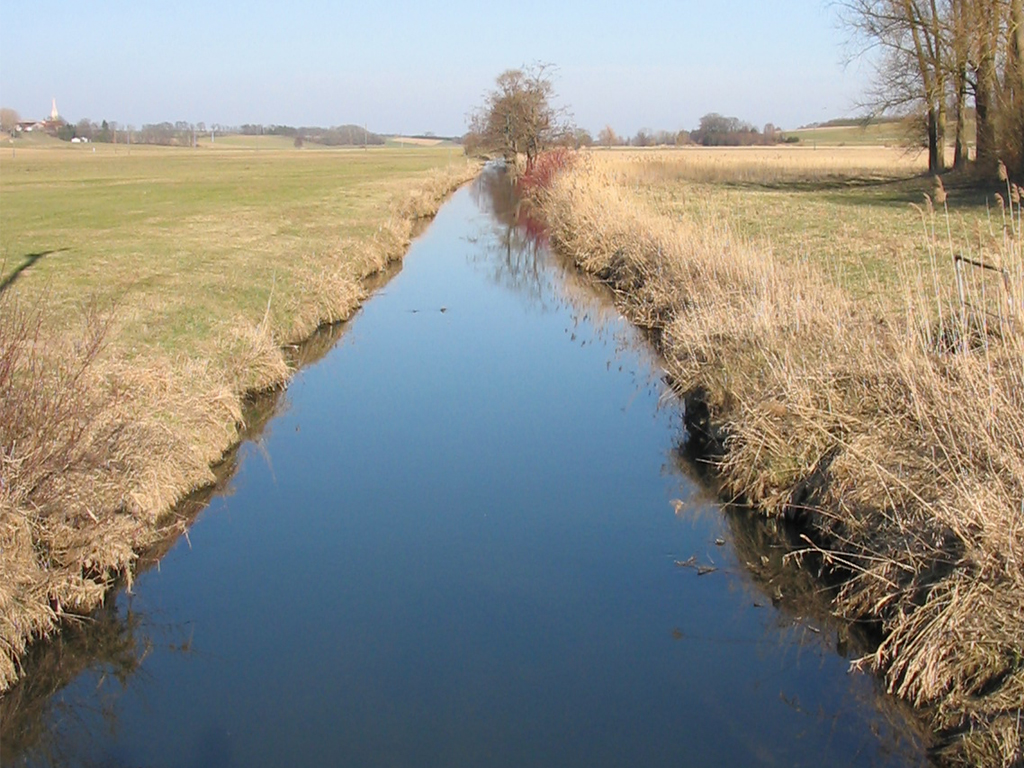
- The Glonn at Taxa, a district of Odelzhausen

Location
- Country: Germany
- State: Bavaria

Physical characteristics
- Source
  - location: at Mittelstetten
  - elevation: about 525 metres (1,722 ft)
- Mouth
  - location: at Allershausen into the Amper
  - coordinates: 48.4331°N 11.6039°E
  - elevation: about 440 metres (1,440 ft)
- Length: 51.7 km (32.1 mi)
- Basin size: 405 km^{2} (156 sq mi)

Basin features
- Progression: Amper→ Isar→ Danube→ Black Sea

The Glonn (German pronunciation: [ɡlɔn]) is a river of Upper Bavaria, Bavaria, Germany.

The Glonn is 51.7 kilometres (32.1 mi) long. It rises southeast of Mittelstetten in the district of Fürstenfeldbruck. It is the main tributary of the Amper; at Allershausen near Freising it discharges from the left into the Amper.

The Glonn flows through an agriculturally used area in the triangle between Augsburg, Freising and Dachau. Larger places in its course are Odelzhausen, Erdweg, Markt Indersdorf, Weichs, Petershausen and Hohenkammer.

== Tributaries ==
- Kollbach
- Röhrersbach (left)
- Tegernbach (left)
- Rettenbach (left)
- Schweinbach (right)
- Umbach (left)
- Rohrbach (right)
- Steinfurter Bach (left)
- Steindlbach (right)
- Zeitlbach (left)
- Riensbach (right)
- Dorfbach (right)
- Eichhofner Bach or Albersbach, resp. (left)
- Rothbach (right)
- Gittersbach (left)
- Langenpettenbach (left)
- Ebersbach
- Klausnerbach

== See also ==
- List of rivers of Bavaria
