= Adamstal =

Coordinates: 50°38′10″N 7°22′52″E

Adamstal is a locality in the municipality Windhagen in the district of Neuwied in Rhineland-Palatinate, Germany.
