= Hüngsberg =

Coordinates: 50°38′N 7°23′E

Hüngsberg is a locality in the municipality of Windhagen in the district of Neuwied in Rhineland-Palatinate, Germany.
