= Schweifeld =

Coordinates: 50°38′N 7°19′E

Schweifeld is a locality in the municipality Windhagen in the district of Neuwied in Rhineland-Palatinate, Germany.
