= Windhagen =

- Municipality
- Coat of arms

- Location of Windhagen within Neuwied district
- Interactive map of Windhagen
- Location within Germany Location within Rhineland-Palatinate
- Coordinates: 50°38′39″N 7°21′27″E
- Country: Germany
- State: Rhineland-Palatinate
- District: Neuwied
- Municipal assoc.: Asbach
- Subdivisions: 16

Government
  - Mayor (2019–24): Martin Buchholz (CDU)

Area
  - Total: 13.11 km^{2} (5.06 sq mi)
- Elevation: 290 m (950 ft)

Population (2025-12-31)
  - Total: 4,664
  - Density: 355.8/km^{2} (921.4/sq mi)
- Time zone: UTC+01:00 (CET)
  - Summer (DST): UTC+02:00 (CEST)
- Postal codes: 53578
- Dialling codes: 02645
- Vehicle registration: NR
- Website: www.windhagen.de

Windhagen is a Municipality in the district of Neuwied, in Rhineland-Palatinate, Germany. Its former mayor used to be the oldest German Mayor, at 94 years old when he finally retired.

Windhagen consists of the following villages:

- Adamstal
- Birken
- Frohnen
- Günterscheid
- Hallerbach
- Hecken
- Hohn
- Hüngsberg
- Johannisberg
- Köhlershohn
- Niederwindhagen
- Oberwindhagen
- Rederscheid
- Schweifeld
- Stockhausen
- Vierwinden
