= Hohenkammer =

- Municipality
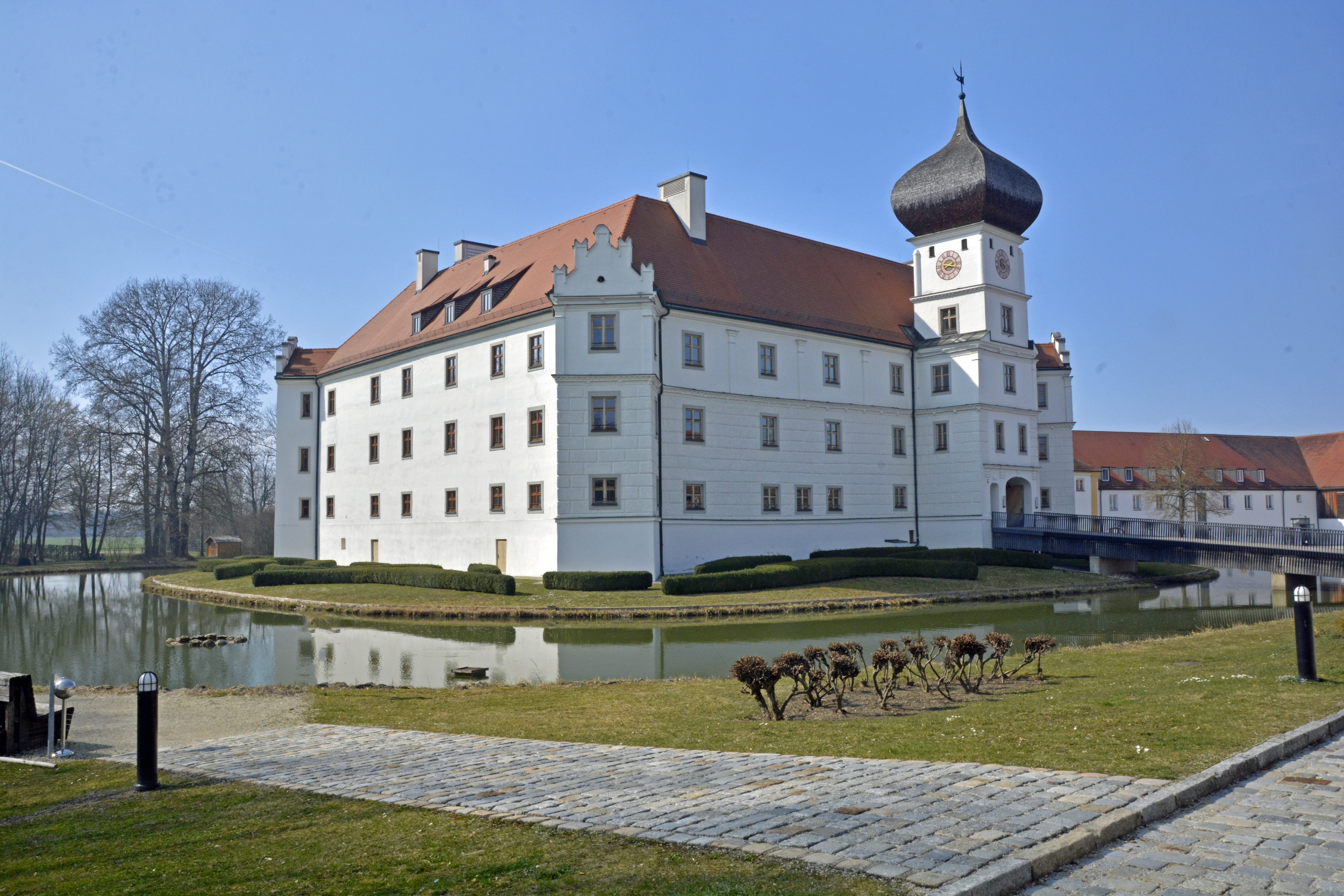
- Hohenkammer Castle

- Coat of arms

- Location of Hohenkammer within Freising district
- Interactive map of Hohenkammer
- Location within Germany Location within Bavaria
- Coordinates: 48°25′N 11°32′E
- Country: Germany
- State: Bavaria
- Admin. region: Oberbayern
- District: Freising

Government
  - Mayor (2020–26): Mario Berti (CSU)

Area
  - Total: 25.74 km^{2} (9.94 sq mi)
- Elevation: 471 m (1,545 ft)

Population (2025-12-31)
  - Total: 2,671
  - Density: 103.8/km^{2} (268.8/sq mi)
- Time zone: UTC+01:00 (CET)
  - Summer (DST): UTC+02:00 (CEST)
- Postal codes: 85411
- Dialling codes: 08137
- Vehicle registration: FS
- Website: www.hohenkammer.de

Hohenkammer (German pronunciation: [ˈhoːənkamɐ]) is a municipality in the district of Freising in Bavaria in Germany. The town is best known for its castle.

== Geography ==
The town lies on the Glonn river as well as the center-point on an ancient medieval road (North-South) from Munich to Ingolstadt. It also lies on an ancient cattle trail (East-West) from Freising to Indersdorf and Augsburg.

== History ==
The village was first mentioned as "Chamara" in 734 AD. The current name only came into use in the 16th century. Since the 15th Century there has been a catholic church (St. Johannes Evangelist) in a late-gothic architecture. Hohenkammer became an independent political municipality in 1818.

== Hohenkammer Castle ==
The original moated castle belonged to the Lords of Kammer (or Camer), who were first documented in the 11th century. They were ministeriales (unfree knights) of the Counts of Scheyern. The castle was burnt down in a devastating fire in 1648, (perhaps in the end-phase of the Thirty Years War). It was rebuilt in the Renaissance style as seen today. In 1917 the castle was sold to the Raiffeisen banking cooperative and was used for years as a bank training center. Since 2003, the castle has been owned by Munich Re (a major re-insurance company), which operates a hotel and conference center with restaurants. The castle was renovated in 2007.
