= Köhlershohn =

Locality in Windhagen, Germany

Coordinates: 50°39′N 7°20′E

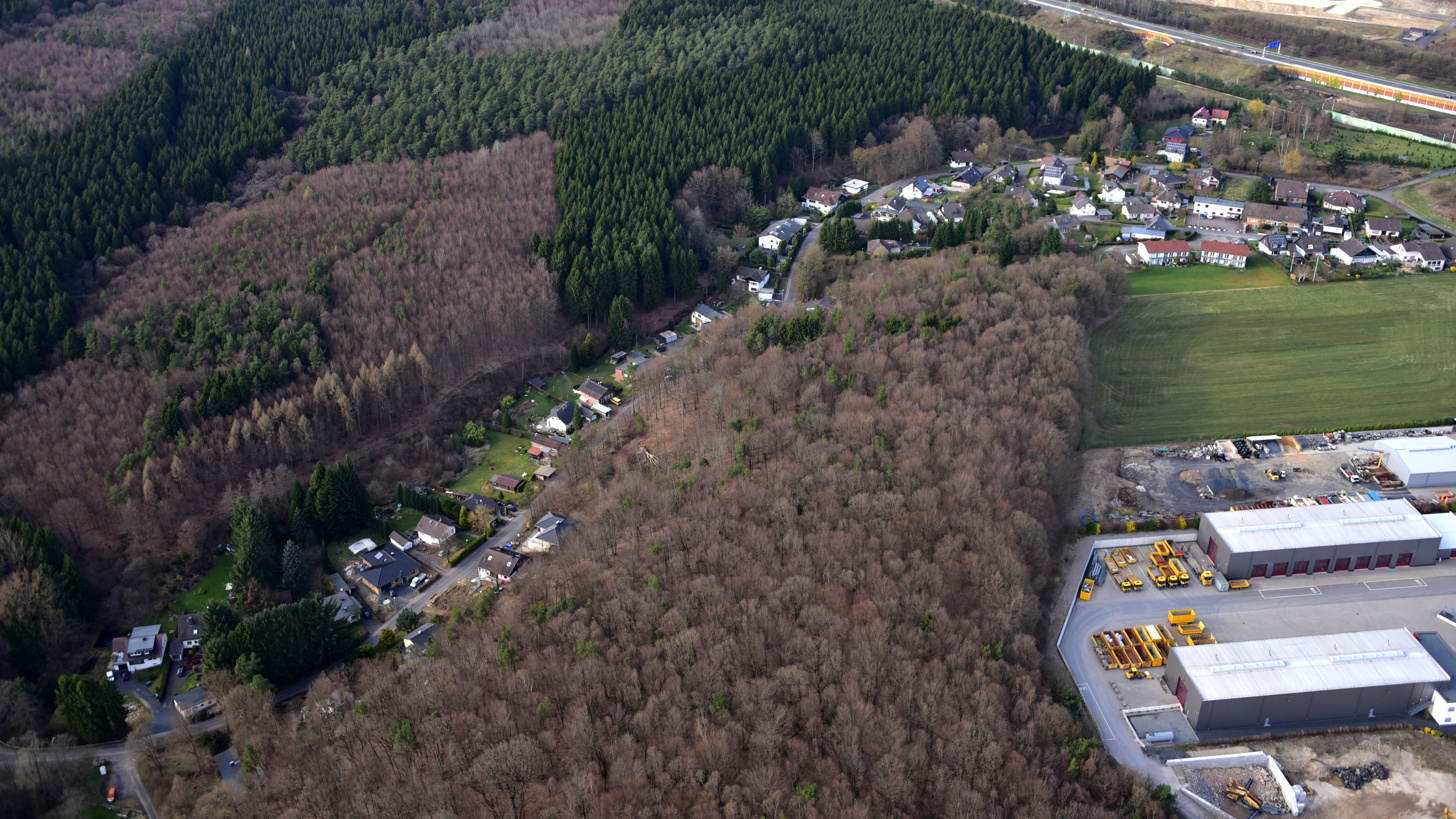

Köhlershohn is a locality in the municipality Windhagen in the district of Neuwied in Rhineland-Palatinate, Germany.
