= Zeitlbach =

River in Germany

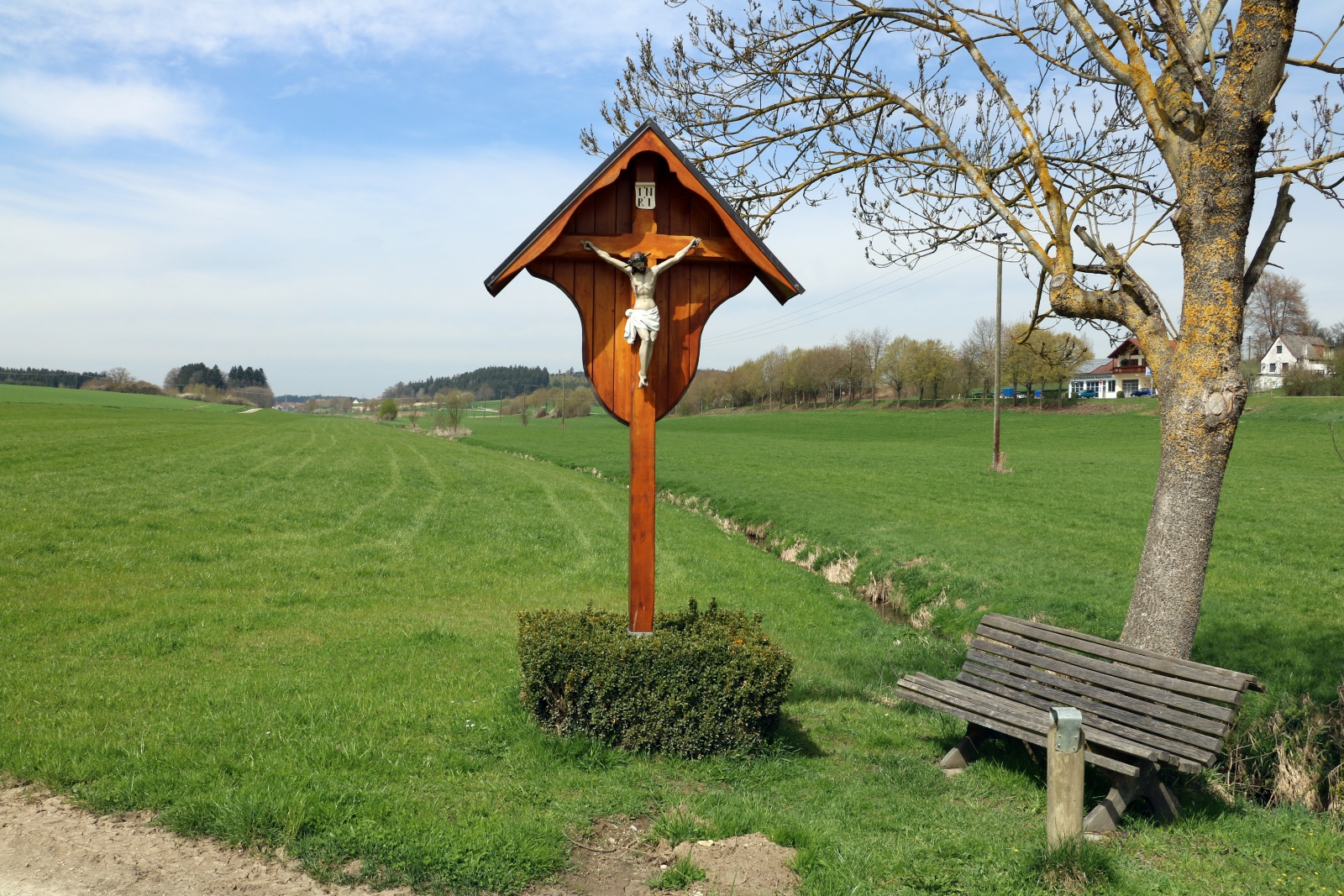
- The Zeitlbach near Unterzeitlbach

- Location within Germany

Location
- Country: Germany
- State: Bavaria

Physical characteristics
- Mouth
  - location: Glonn
  - coordinates: 48°20′15″N 11°18′53″E
- Length: 10.3 km (6.4 mi)

Basin features
- Progression: Glonn→ Amper→ Isar→ Danube→ Black Sea

Zeitlbach is a river of Bavaria, Germany. It flows into the Glonn near Erdweg.

== See also ==
- List of rivers of Bavaria
