= Günterscheid =

Coordinates: 50°38′N 7°22′E

Günterscheid is a locality in the municipality Windhagen in the district of Neuwied in Rhineland-Palatinate, Germany.
