= Oberwindhagen =

Village in Rhineland-Palatinate, Germany

Coordinates: 50°39′N 7°21′E

Oberwindhagen is a locality in the municipality Windhagen in the district of Neuwied in Rhineland-Palatinate, Germany.
