= Vierwinden =

Coordinates: 50°38′31.56″N 7°20′58.16″E

Vierwinden is a locality in the municipality Windhagen in the district of Neuwied in Rhineland-Palatinate, Germany.
