= Aspach =

Aspach is the name or part of the name of several places:

- Aspach, Baden-Württemberg, Germany
- Aspach, Thuringia, Germany
- Aspach, Upper Austria, Austria
- Aspach, Moselle, in the Moselle département, France
- Aspach, Haut-Rhin, in the Haut-Rhin département, France
- Aspach-le-Bas, in the Haut-Rhin département
- Aspach-le-Haut, in the Haut-Rhin département

== See also ==
- Asbach
- Aespa (disambiguation)
