= Weichs =

- Municipality
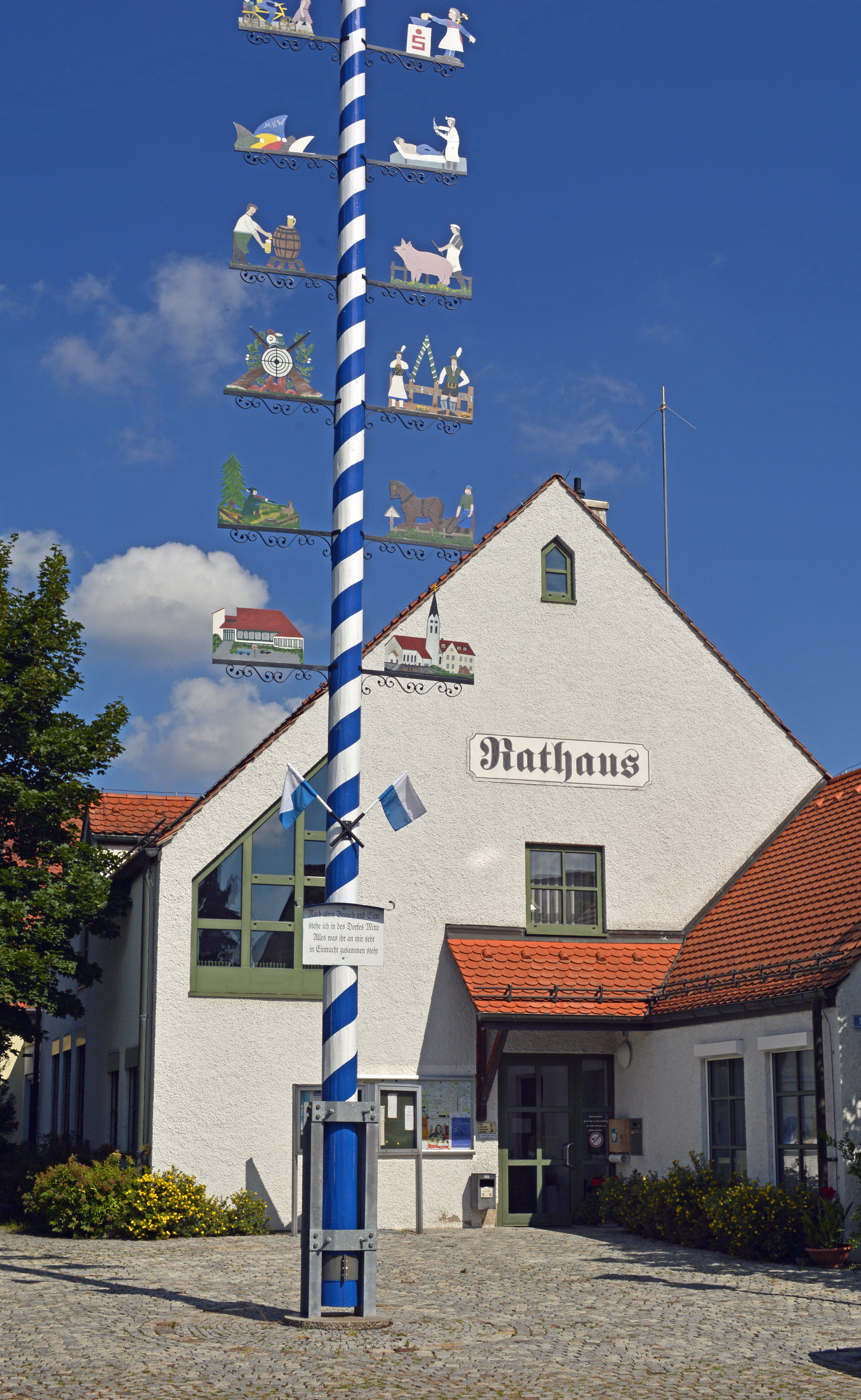
- Town hall

- Coat of arms

- Location of Weichs within Dachau district
- Interactive map of Weichs
- Location within Germany Location within Bavaria
- Coordinates: 48°23′N 11°25′E
- Country: Germany
- State: Bavaria
- Admin. region: Oberbayern
- District: Dachau

Government
  - Mayor (2020–26): Harald Mundl

Area
  - Total: 18.72 km^{2} (7.23 sq mi)
- Elevation: 468 m (1,535 ft)

Population (2025-12-31)
  - Total: 3,672
  - Density: 196.2/km^{2} (508.0/sq mi)
- Time zone: UTC+01:00 (CET)
  - Summer (DST): UTC+02:00 (CEST)
- Postal codes: 85258
- Dialling codes: 08136
- Vehicle registration: DAH
- Website: www.weichs.de

Weichs (German pronunciation: [vaɪks]) is a municipality in the district of Dachau in Bavaria, Germany. There are four main villages in the municipality: Weichs, Aufhausen, Ebersbach, and Fränking. In addition, there are several smaller villages: Albertshof, Biechlhof, Breitenwiesen, Daxberg, Edenholzhausen, Edenpfaffenhofen, Erlbach, Erlhausen, Hölzböck, Jedenhofen, and Zillhofen.

== Geography ==
Weichs is located in a area of hills leading to the Glonn river, a typical example of Bavarian countryside. Each village is a small knot of white homes with red roofs, interspersed with small dairy farms and Bavarian churches, and surrounded by fields of barley and corn. Near the town is a natural marshland called 'Weichser Moos'.

== History ==
Weichs was first mentioned in a document in 807. The nobleman Deotpurc de Wihse donated property to the cathedral in Freising. This knightly family was often called "the Weichser" or "von Weichs". The name of the place can be derived from common Germanic "wīhsą" as well as from the Latin name "vicus", a smaller form of settlement, which linguistically developed through "Wihs" to today's Weichs.

At the end of the 15th century, St. Martin was built as a Gothic parish church. In the 1560s a hospital was founded to accommodate the sick and elderly.

Weichs was also affected by the Thirty Years' War: In 1634, 1646 and 1648, Swedes, Spaniards, French, Imperialist Armies from Vienna, and Bavarians roamed the country, robbing and plundering. Many farms and the hospital suffered great damage. The oldest surviving church book began in 1643. The first teacher was recorded in it in 1652. From 1720 to 1725, the church was enlarged and received a baroque interior.

In 1818, Weichs became an independent municipality. In 1848, the barons von Weichs' castle was converted into a monastery with an attached school in 1852.

In 1862, the first small factory (machine foundry) was built on Erlbach. From 1861, the old mill in Weichs was converted into an industrial company, which was modernized again and again until it was closed in 1974. A shoe factory was built in the 1920s.

In 2007, Weichs celebrated its official 1200th anniversary.

== Industry, Politic and Sport ==
Weichs is surrounded by farmlands, indicating that agriculture is its biggest industry.

The Mayor of Weichs (Bürgermeister) is Harald Mundl (Independent - Local Weichs Party) since 2008.

Weichs has a small industry park with various small to mid-sized businesses. They also have electronic/semi-conductor companies such as E.E.P.D and Metronics.

Weichs offers several restaurants. Traditional Bavarian restaurants are common, as are Greek and Italian eateries. There are several bakeries and small shops, including a pharmacy, mini-supermarket, post office, and horse-riding school.

The local sports club is called SV-Weichs.

There is also a mountain-bike park in the woods between Weichs and Fränking.

Since 2012, there is an indoor soccer training arena in Fränking near Weichs. Also in Fränking there is an Events Hall for wedding receptions called the 'Grafenstadl' (opened in 2021).

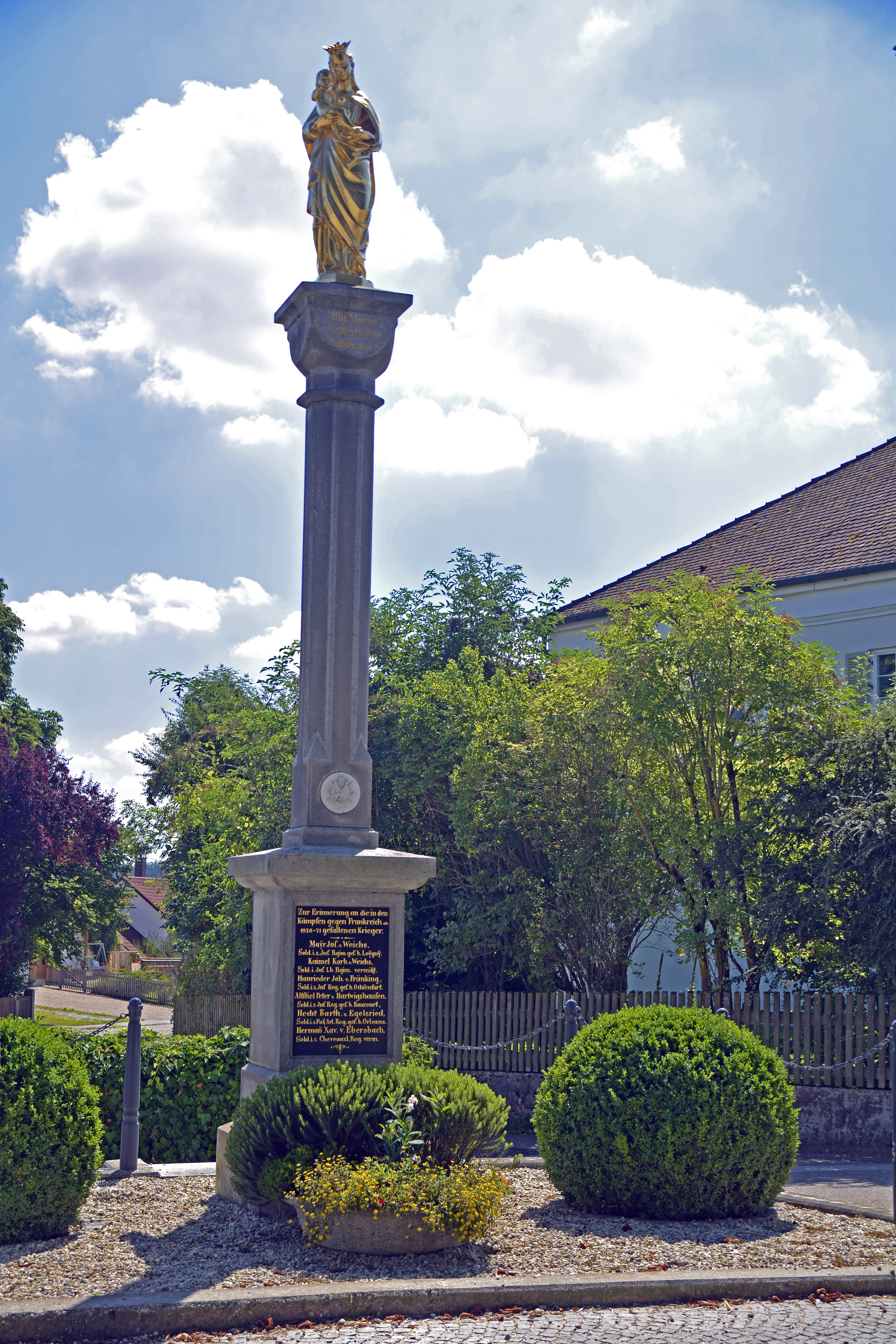
War memorial statue in Weichs

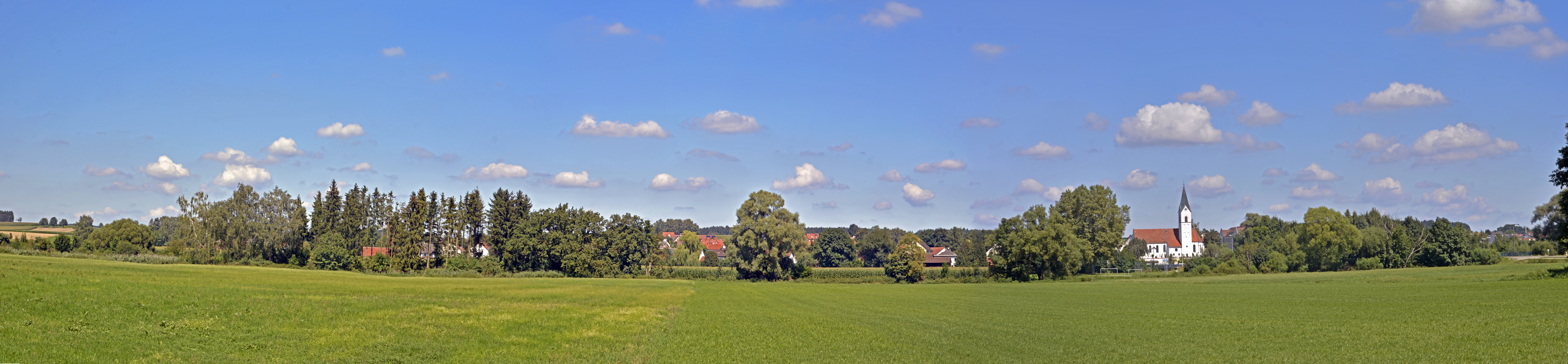
Panorama of Weichs
