= Hallerbach (Windhagen) =

Coordinates: 50°38′N 7°20′E

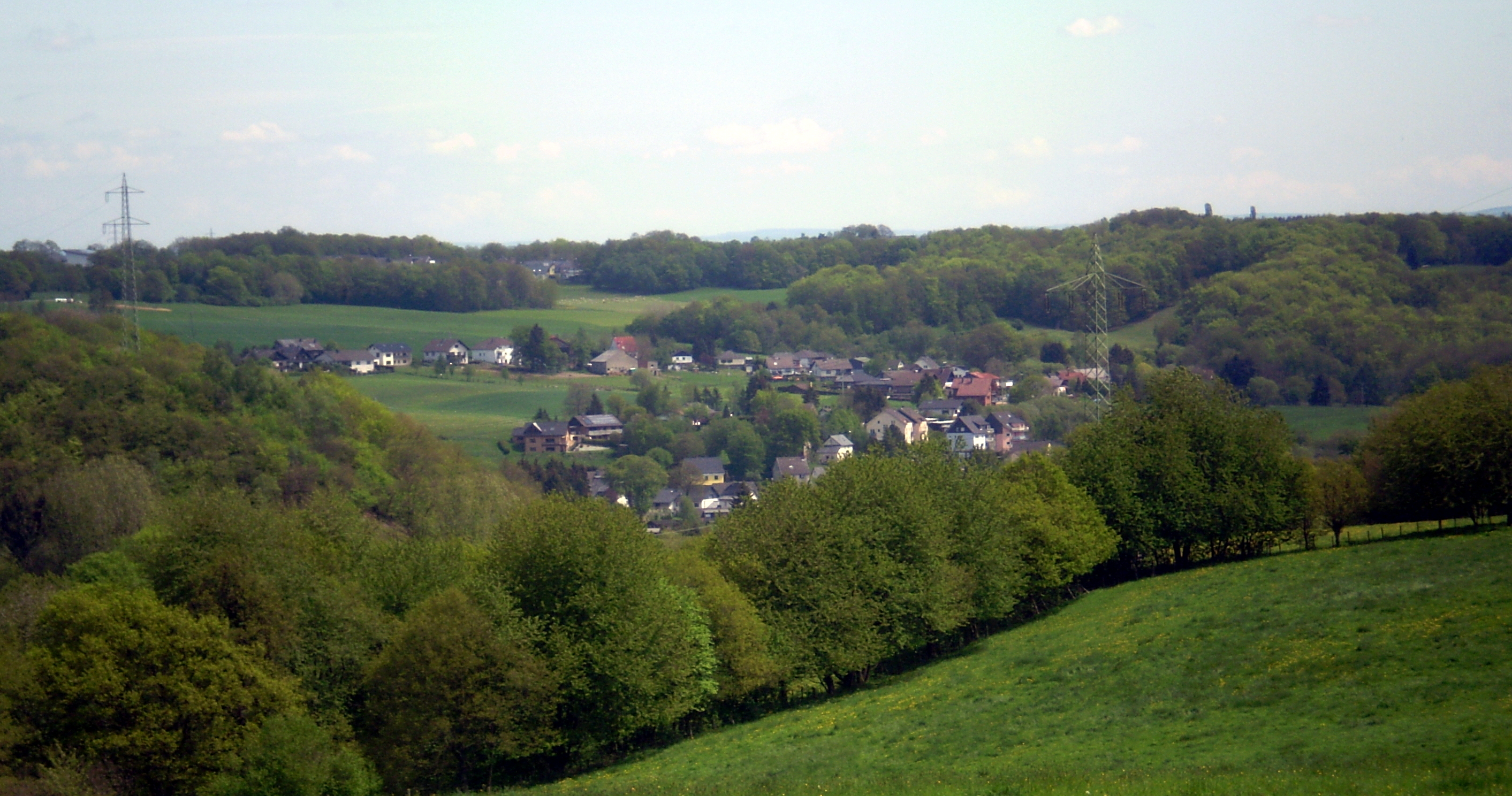
Hallerbach (front) and Frohnen (back)

Hallerbach is a locality in the municipality Windhagen in the district of Neuwied in Rhineland-Palatinate, Germany.

It was the birthplace of Josef Rüddel, the long-time mayor of Windhagen who served for 56 years, from 1963 to 2019, after being re-elected 14 times.

As of 30 June 2024, Hallerbach had a population of 135.
