= Neustadt (Wied) =

- Municipality
- Coat of arms

- Location of Neustadt within Neuwied district
- Interactive map of Neustadt
- Location within Germany Location within Rhineland-Palatinate
- Coordinates: 50°37′15″N 7°25′44″E
- Country: Germany
- State: Rhineland-Palatinate
- District: Neuwied
- Municipal assoc.: Asbach
- Subdivisions: 56

Government
  - Mayor (2019–24): Thomas Junior (CDU)

Area
  - Total: 35.81 km^{2} (13.83 sq mi)
- Elevation: 175 m (574 ft)

Population (2025-12-31)
  - Total: 6,546
  - Density: 182.8/km^{2} (473.4/sq mi)
- Time zone: UTC+01:00 (CET)
  - Summer (DST): UTC+02:00 (CEST)
- Postal codes: 53577
- Dialling codes: 02683
- Vehicle registration: NR
- Website: www.neustadt-wied.com

Neustadt (Wied) or Neustadt an der Wied is a municipality in the district of Neuwied in Rhineland-Palatinate, Germany. It is situated about 30 kilometres (20 miles) south-east of Bonn in the Rhine-Westerwald Nature Park. Neustadt is part of the Asbach collective municipality.

== Transport ==
Neustadt had a station at the Linz - Flammersfeld railway, which is out of service for passenger trains, but a part of the line was several times in use for service through touristic special trains.
