= Vana-Aespa =

Village in Estonia

- Village
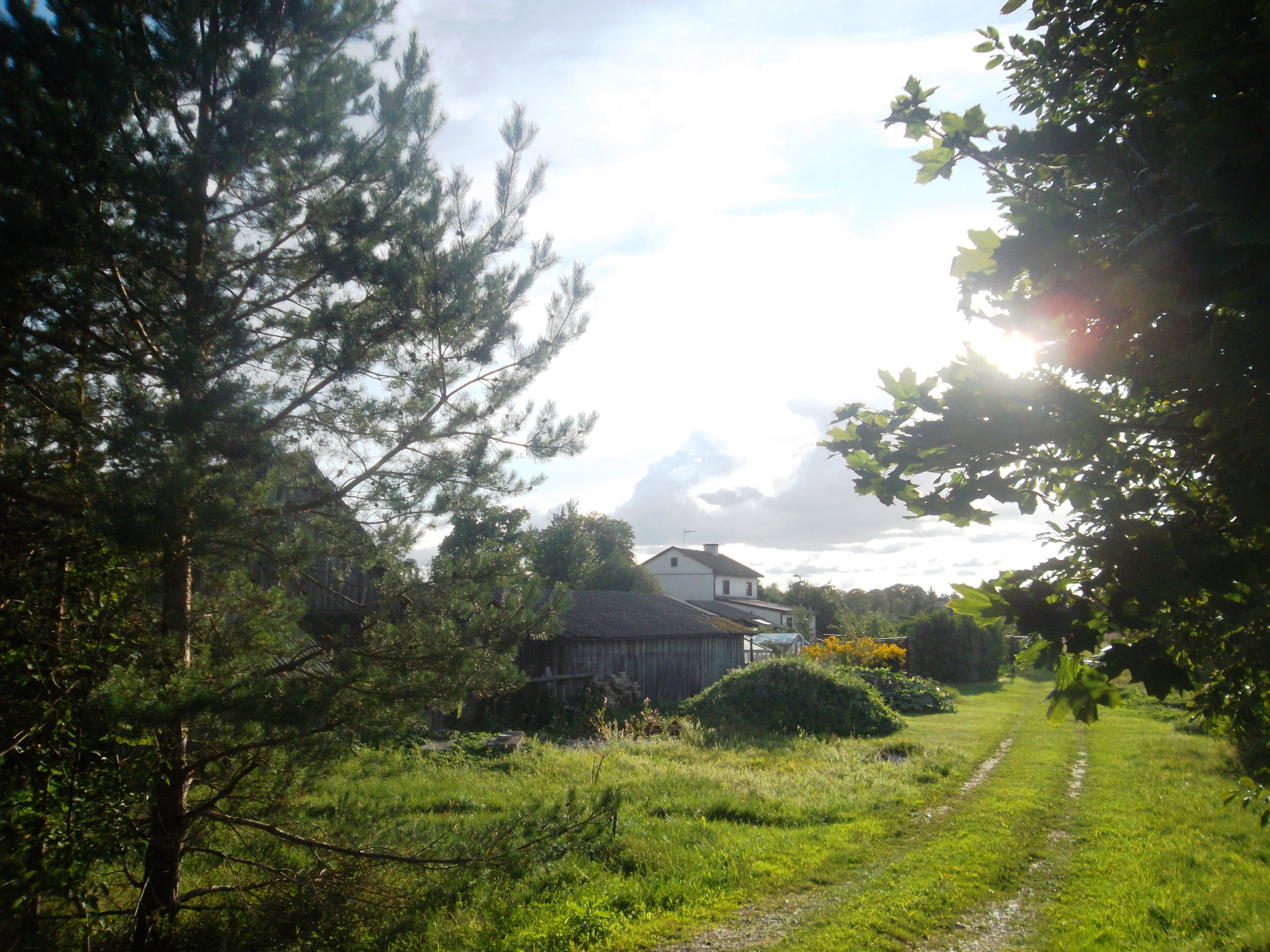
- Houses in Vana-Aespa

- Location in Estonia
- Coordinates: 59°11′31″N 24°39′00″E
- Country: Estonia
- County: Rapla County
- Municipality: Kohila Parish
- Established: 20 December 2011

Vana-Aespa is a village in Kohila Parish, Rapla County in northern Estonia. It is located about 6 km (4 mi) northwest of the borough of Kohila, between Hageri and Aespa.

== History ==
Vana-Aespa was established on 20 December 2011 by dividing the village of Aespa in two. The new settlements were the small borough of Aespa and Vana-Aespa village.
