= Aespa, Rapla County =

Borough in Estonia

Coordinates: 59°12′N 24°40′E

Aespa
- Small borough
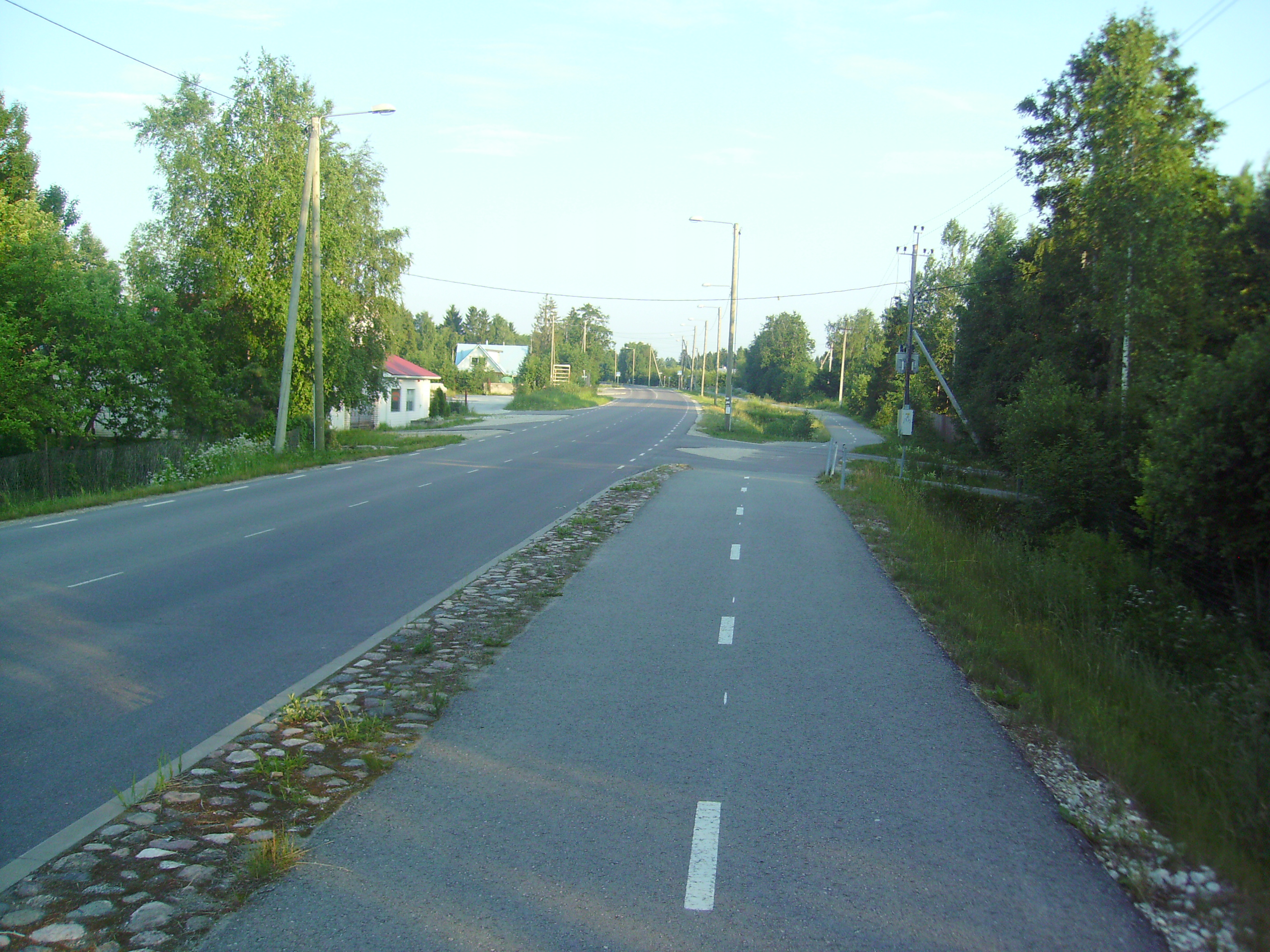
- Interactive map of Aespa
- Country: Estonia
- County: Rapla County
- Parish: Kohila Parish
- Time zone: UTC+2 (EET)
  - Summer (DST): UTC+3 (EEST)

Aespa is a small borough (Estonian: alevik) in Kohila Parish, Rapla County in northwestern Estonia. The original single village of Aespa was divided into Aespa and Vana-Aespa in 2011.
