= Asbach (Verbandsgemeinde) =

- Verbandsgemeinde
- Location of Asbach within Neuwied district
- Interactive map of Asbach
- Location within Germany Location within Rhineland-Palatinate
- Coordinates: 50°40′N 7°26′E
- Country: Germany
- State: Rhineland-Palatinate
- District: Neuwied
- Seat: Asbach
- Subdivisions: 4 municipalities

Area
  - Total: 108.12 km^{2} (41.75 sq mi)

Population (2025-12-31)
  - Total: 23,741
  - Density: 219.58/km^{2} (568.71/sq mi)
- Time zone: UTC+01:00 (CET)
  - Summer (DST): UTC+02:00 (CEST)
- Website: vg-asbach.de

Asbach is a Verbandsgemeinde ("collective municipality") in the district of Neuwied, in Rhineland-Palatinate, Germany. The seat of the Verbandsgemeinde is in Asbach.

The Verbandsgemeinde Asbach consists of the following Ortsgemeinden ("local municipalities"):

1. Asbach
2. Buchholz
3. Neustadt (Wied)
4. Windhagen
