= Asbach (Westerwald) =

- Municipality
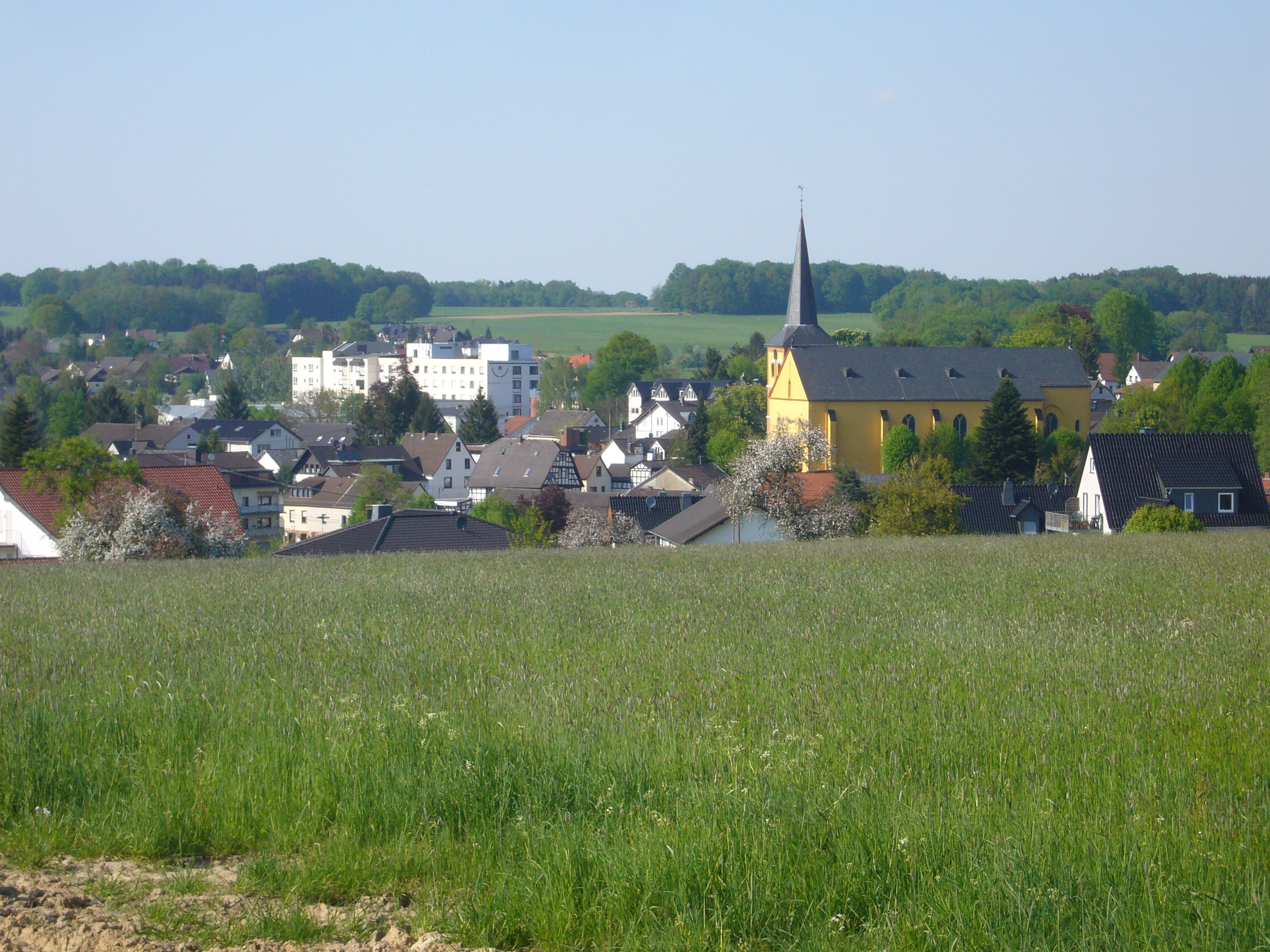
- Asbach

- Coat of arms

- Location of Asbach within Neuwied district
- Interactive map of Asbach
- Location within Germany Location within Rhineland-Palatinate
- Coordinates: 50°40′00″N 7°25′33″E
- Country: Germany
- State: Rhineland-Palatinate
- District: Neuwied
- Municipal assoc.: Asbach
- Subdivisions: 45 Ortsteile

Government
  - Mayor (2019–24): Franz-Peter Dahl (CDU)

Area
  - Total: 38.59 km^{2} (14.90 sq mi)
- Elevation: 275 m (902 ft)

Population (2025-12-31)
  - Total: 7,820
  - Density: 203/km^{2} (525/sq mi)
- Time zone: UTC+01:00 (CET)
  - Summer (DST): UTC+02:00 (CEST)
- Postal codes: 53567
- Dialling codes: 02683
- Vehicle registration: NR
- Website: www.gemeinde-asbach.de

Asbach is a municipality in the district of Neuwied, in Rhineland-Palatinate, Germany. It is situated in the Westerwald, approx. 25 km north of Neuwied, and 25 km south-east of Bonn.

Asbach is the seat of the Verbandsgemeinde ("collective municipality") Asbach.
