= Mittelstetten =

- Municipality
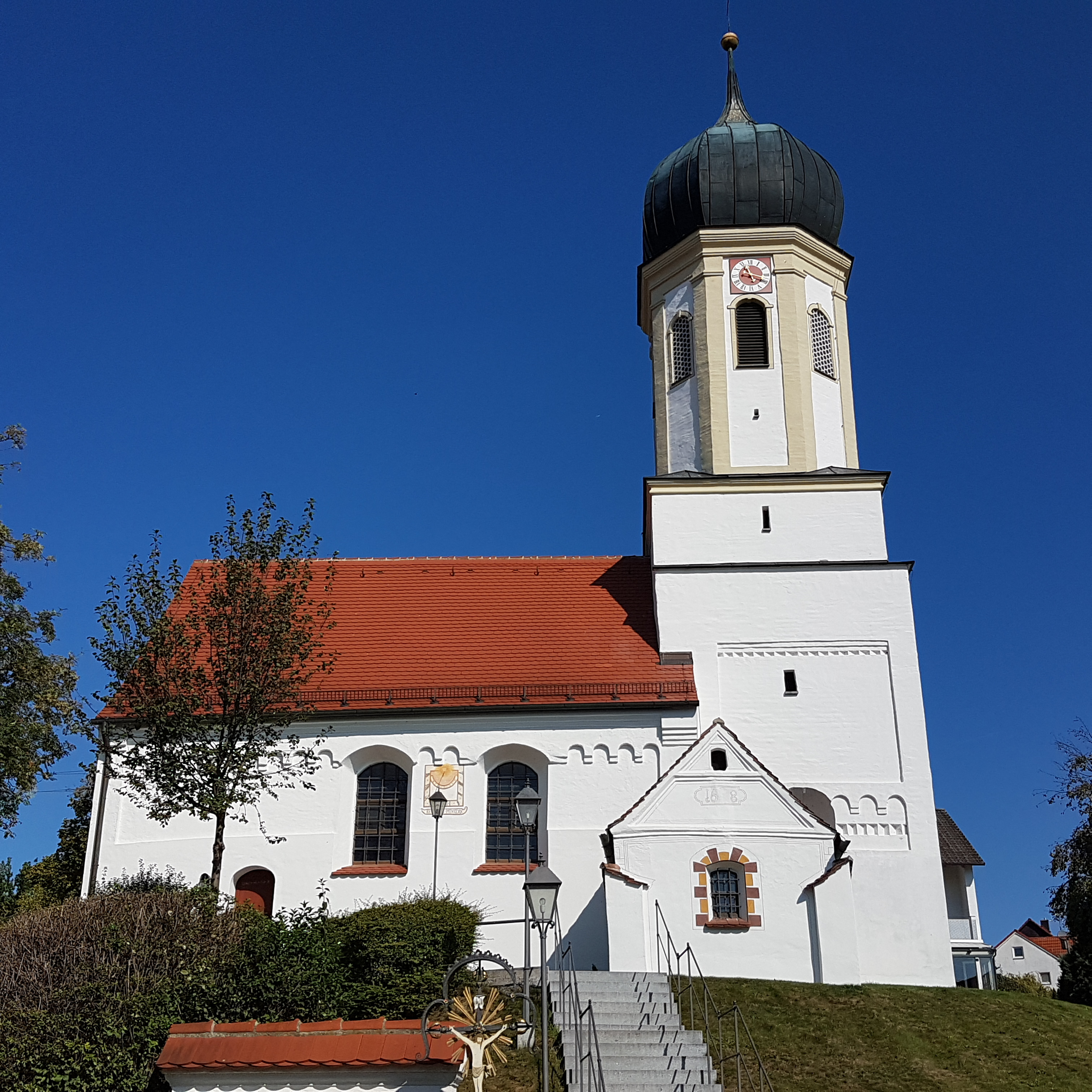
- Church of Saints Stephen and Magdalene in Tegernbach

- Coat of arms

- Location of Mittelstetten within Fürstenfeldbruck district
- Interactive map of Mittelstetten
- Location within Germany Location within Bavaria
- Coordinates: 48°15′N 11°6′E
- Country: Germany
- State: Bavaria
- Admin. region: Oberbayern
- District: Fürstenfeldbruck
- Municipal assoc.: Mammendorf
- Subdivisions: 6 Ortsteile

Government
  - Mayor (2020–26): Franz Ostermeier

Area
  - Total: 18.62 km^{2} (7.19 sq mi)
- Elevation: 514 m (1,686 ft)

Population (2025-12-31)
  - Total: 1,691
  - Density: 90.82/km^{2} (235.2/sq mi)
- Time zone: UTC+01:00 (CET)
  - Summer (DST): UTC+02:00 (CEST)
- Postal codes: 82293
- Dialling codes: 08202
- Vehicle registration: FFB
- Website: https://www.mittelstetten.de/

Mittelstetten (German pronunciation: [mɪtl̩ˈʃtɛtn̩]) is a municipality in the district of Fürstenfeldbruck in Bavaria in Germany.
