= Petershausen =

- Municipality
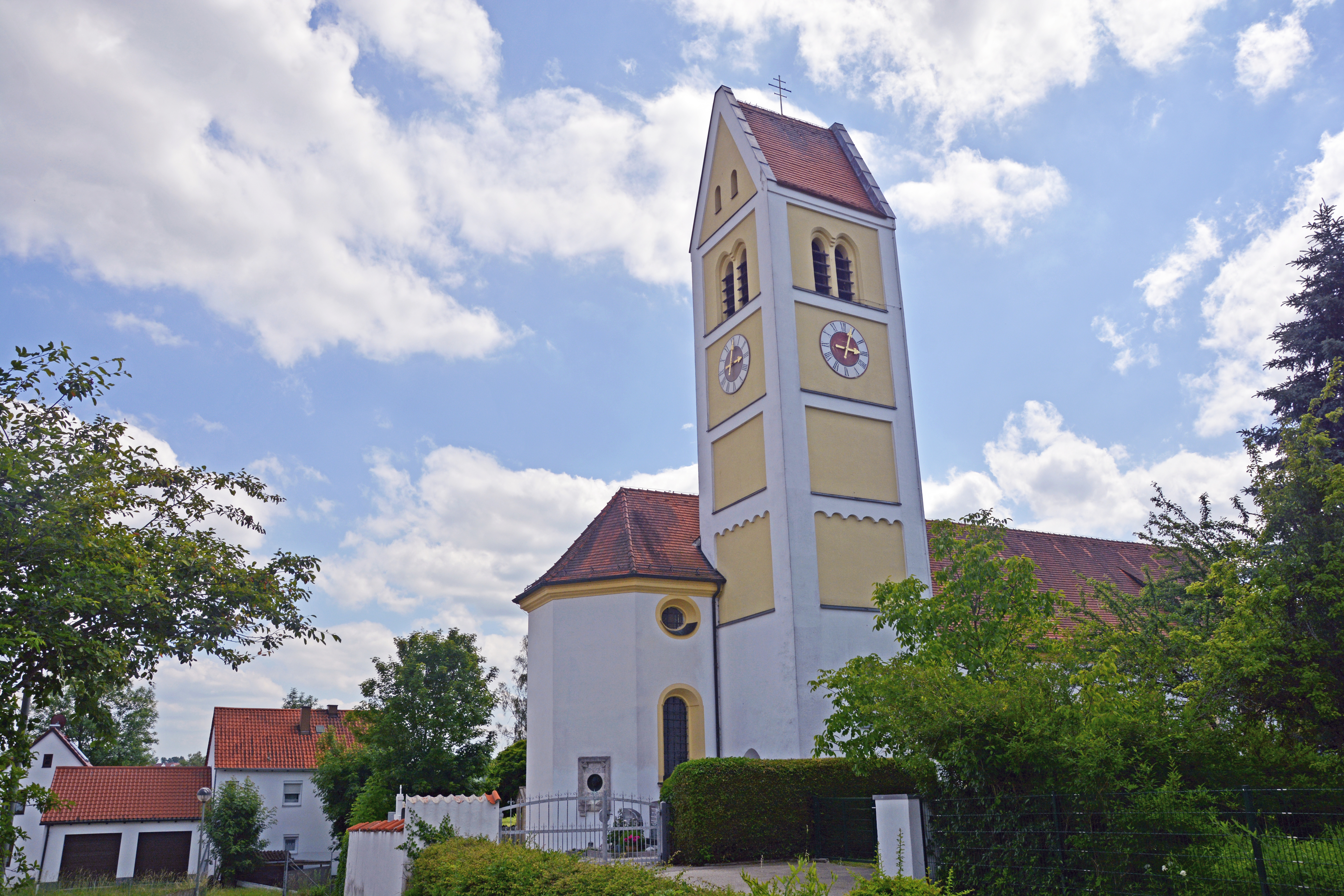
- St. Laurentius Church - Petershausen

- Coat of arms

- Location of Petershausen within Dachau district
- Interactive map of Petershausen
- Location within Germany Location within Bavaria
- Coordinates: 48°24′37″N 11°28′15″E
- Country: Germany
- State: Bavaria
- Admin. region: Oberbayern
- District: Dachau
- Subdivisions: 18 Ortsteile

Government
  - Mayor (2020–26): Marcel Fath (FW)

Area
  - Total: 32.79 km^{2} (12.66 sq mi)
- Elevation: 460 m (1,510 ft)

Population (2025-12-31)
  - Total: 6,401
  - Density: 195.2/km^{2} (505.6/sq mi)
- Time zone: UTC+01:00 (CET)
  - Summer (DST): UTC+02:00 (CEST)
- Postal codes: 85238
- Dialling codes: 08137
- Vehicle registration: DAH
- Website: www.petershausen.de

Petershausen (German pronunciation: [peːtɐsˈhaʊzn̩]) is a municipality in the district of Dachau in Bavaria in Germany.

== Geography ==
Petershausen is located in the valley of the Glonn with extensive floodplains. Much of the area outside of Petershausen is part of a nature preserve.

== History ==
The area around Petershausen has been inhabited for centuries by the Celts of the Vindelici tribe. There are burial mounds that date as far back as 1500 BC near Petershausen (Obermarbach).

The Romans and early Bavarians also inhabited the area.

During Roman occupation, a road from Salzburg to Augsburg passed through Petershausen. Part of this road would be used for oxen/cattle trading during the Middle Ages.

The place name 'Petershausen' was first mentioned in a church document 1116 AD, concerning the local church (St. Laurentius).

The 'Pertrichhof' in the center of the village was built around 1500 as a tavern and still exists today as a charming 'Wirtshaus'.

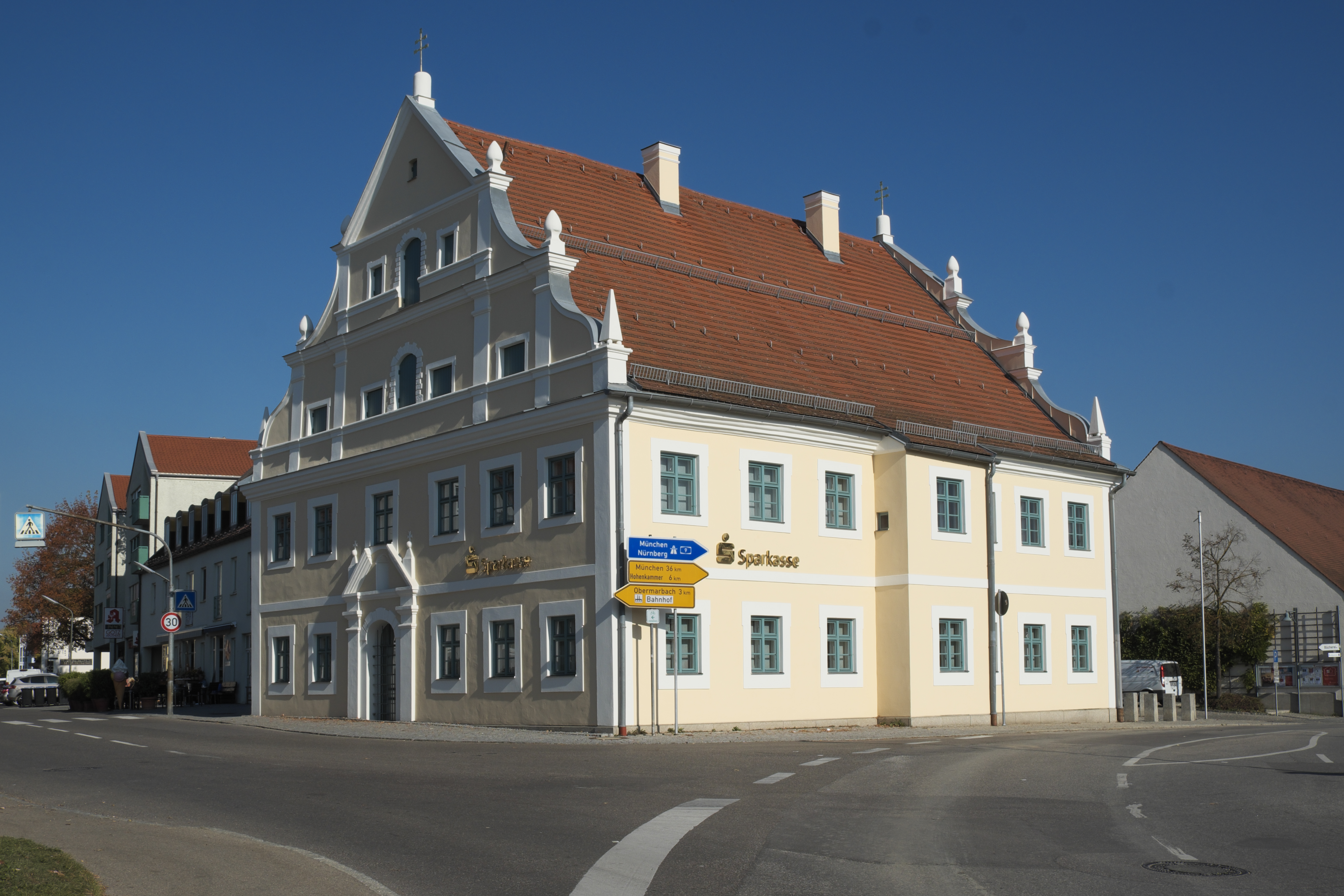
Pertrichhof tavern in Petershausen. Built ca. 1500

The town and church were greatly damaged during the Thirty Years War and by plague.

During the War of the Spanish Succession in 1704, the Austrians looted the church.

Since 1755 there was a school in Petershausen.

In 1867 the Munich - Ingolstadt railway line, on which the Petershausen station is located, was built.

The town symbol (coat of arms) of Petershausen is a fish and a plow.

== Development ==
Between 1988 and 2018 the parish grew from 4,481 to 6,551.

The mayor (Bürgermeister) has been Marcel Fath from the Free Voters Party since May 2014.

Today Petershausen is the northern end of S-Bahn line 2, but is also served by regional trains every hour to half an hour and is on the Munich railway line.
