= Armand (name) =

- Pronunciation: [aʁmɑ̃]
- Gender: Male

Origin
- Origin: Germanic languages
- Meaning: army's man
- Region of origin: Northern Europe

Other names
- Related names: Hermann, Herman, Harman, Armando, Armands, Ermanno
- Popularity: see popular names

Armand is a French masculine given name and surname, the French form of Herman.

Notable people with the name include:

== Given name ==
- Saint Herman, aka, Saint Armand
- Armand (photographer) (1901–63), Armenian photographer
- Armand Arabian (1934–2018), American judge
- Armand Assante (b. 1949), American actor
- Armand Borel (1923–2003), Swiss mathematician,
- Armand Călinescu (1893–1939), Romanian Prime Minister
- Armand D'Angour (b. 1958), British classicist
- Armand de Bourbon, Prince of Conti (1629–66), French noble
- Armand de Gontaut, Baron of Biron (1524–92), French soldier
- Armand de Gramont, Comte de Guiche (1637–73), French noble
- Armand de La Richardie (1686–1758), French Roman Catholic missionary
- Armand de Pontmartin (1811–90), French literary critic and essayist
- Armand Doré (1824–1882), French painter.
- Armand Doria (1824–1896), French art collector.
- Armand, duc d'Aiguillon (1750–1800), French noble
- Armand Duplantis (born 1999), American-born Swedish athlete
- Armand Forest, American politician
- Armand Hammer (1898–1990), American Industrialist
- Armand of Kersaint (1742–93), French sailor and politician
- Armand LaMontagne (1938–2025), American sculptor
- Armand Lohikoski (1912–2005), Finnish movie director & writer
- Armand Lurville (1875–1955), French actor
- Armand Marquiset (1900–1981), French philanthropist
- Armand Mauss (1928–2020), American sociologist of religion
- Armand Membou (born 2004), American football player
- Armand Mouyal (1925–1988), French world champion épée fencer
- Armand Peugeot (1849–1915), French industrialist and pioneer of the automobile industry
- Armand Rajabpour-Miyandoabis (born 1997), 2023 Paris attack perpetrator
- Armand Jean du Plessis de Richelieu (1585–1642), French clergyman and statesman commonly known as Cardinal Richelieu
- Armand Schiele (born 1967), French alpine skier
- Armand Van Helden (born 1970), American DJ and musician

== Surname ==
- Antoine Armand (born 1991), French politician
- Abraham Armand, Roman Catholic priest
- David Armand (born 1977), English actor
- Émile Armand (1872–1962), French anarchist
- Frøydis Armand (1949–2022), Norwegian actress
- Gesner Armand (1936–2008), Haitian painter
- Gisken Armand (born 1962), Norwegian actress
- Inessa Armand (1874–1920), French communist
- Jack Armand (1898–1974), English footballer
- Jean Armand de Lestocq (1692–1767), French adventurer
- Joseph-François Armand (1820–1903), Canadian politician
- Leanne Armand (born 1968), Australian marine scientist
- Louis Armand (1905–71), French Resistance member
- Patrick Armand, French ballet dancer
- Romain Armand (born 1987), French footballer
- Sylvain Armand (born 1980), retired French footballer

== Fictional characters ==
- Armand (The Vampire Chronicles), character from The Vampire Chronicles novels
- Count Armand, character from the movie The Legend of Zorro
- Armand Goldman, Robin Williams' character in the movie The Bircage

== See also ==
- Armand Commission, first commission of the European Atomic Energy Community
- Armand de Brignac, champagne brand produced by Champagne Cattier
- Armand's Legion, Continental Army military unit
- St Armand (disambiguation)
  - Saint-Armand, Quebec
  - St. Armand, New York
  - St. Armand's Key in Florida
- Arman (name)
