= Herman (name) =

- Pronunciation: /ˈhɜːrmən/
- Gender: Male

Origin
- Origin: Germanic languages
- Meaning: army's man
- Region of origin: Northern Europe, Western Europe, Central Europe

Other names
- Related names: Hermann, Armand, Armando, Ermanno, Harmon, Armin
- Popularity: see popular names

Herman is a masculine given name, from an ancient Germanic name consisting of the elements harja- "army" and mann- "man". Hermine is the feminine form of Herman. It is first recorded in the 8th century, in the forms Hariman, Heriman, Hairman, Herman.

It regained popularity in the English-speaking world in the 19th century, particularly in the United States amongst German Americans.

Herman remains widely used in Dutch and Scandinavian languages. Variant forms include German Hermann; French Armand; Italian, Spanish and Portuguese Armando; Italian Ermanno.

The name of Arminius, the 1st-century leader of the Cherusci, became identified with the name Hermann in German historiography in the early modern period; thus, Arminius is traditionally known as Hermann der Cheruskerfürst in German. The name of Arminius is in fact from a stem ermen- "strong". The conflation of this element with the name Herman may indeed date to the medieval period, via variant forms such as Ermin, Ermen, Erman, Ermanno, feminine Ermina, Ermana, Hirmina, Hermena.

== Middle Ages ==
- Herman I (archbishop of Cologne) (d. 924)
- Herman I, Duke of Swabia (d. 949)
- Hermann Billung Duke of Saxony (d. 973)
- Herman II, Duke of Swabia (d. 1003)
- Herman III, Duke of Swabia (d. 1012)
- Herman IV, Duke of Swabia (d. 1038)
- Herman II (archbishop of Cologne) (d. 1056)
- Hermann of Reichenau (1013–1064)
- Herman (bishop of Salisbury), bishop of Ramsbury, Sherborne and Salisbury (d. 1078)
- Hermann of Salm (d. 1088)
- Herman the Archdeacon, hagiographer, d. 1090s
- Herman II, Margrave of Baden (d. 1130)
- Herman van Horne (d. 1156), bishop of Utrecht
- Herman of Carinthia (ca. 1100–ca. 1160), Benedictine scholar
- Herman Joseph of Cologne (1150–1243)
- Hermannus Alemannus, Herman the German, 13th-century translator
- Hermann von Münster (d. 1392), master glassmaker
- Hermann II, Count of Celje (1365–1435)
- Herman of Valaam, saint of the Russian Orthodox Church and founder of the Valaam Monastery in Karelia (date unknown, 10th to 15th centuries)

== Early Modern ==
- Hermann of Wied, archbishop of Cologne (1477–1552)
- Herman de Lynden (1547–1603), Belgian military commander in the Eighty Years' War
- Catharina Herman (died after 1604), Dutch war heroine
- Jobst Herman, Count of Lippe (1625–1678), German noble
- Herman Boerhaave (1668–1738), Dutch botanist
- Herman Petersen (1713–1765), Swedish merchant
- Herman of Alaska (1756–1837), Russian missionary to Alaska

== Modern ==
The name Herman was popular in the United States during the late 19th and early 20th century, consistently ranking between 55 and 44 throughout the 1880–1914 period. Beginning with World War I, the name's popularity entered a steady decline for the remainder of the twentieth century, falling below rank 1,000 in the year 2000.

- Herman (Aav), (1878–1961), head of the Orthodox Church of Finland
- Herman (Swaiko) (1932–2022), head of the Orthodox Church in America
- Herman Abban (born 1994), Ghanaian tennis player
- Hermán Aceros (1938–2018), Colombian footballer
- Herman M. Albert (1901–1947), American lawyer and politician
- Herman D. Aldrich (1801–1880), American businessman
- Herman Barron (1909–1978), American professional golfer
- Herman Berendsen (1934–2019), Dutch chemist
- Herman Berlinski (1910–2001), German-born American composer and conductor
- Herman Bouma (born 1934), Dutch vision researcher and gerontechnologist
- Herman Cain (1945–2020), American businessman, talk show host, and candidate for the 2012 Republican presidential nomination
- Herman Dreer (1888–1981), American academic administrator, educational reformer and activist, author, editor, minister, and civil rights leader
- Herman Louis Duhring Jr. (1874–1953), American architect
- Herman Edwards (born 1954), known as Herm Edwards, American football player and coach
- Herman Becker Fast (1887–1938), American businessman, farmer, politician
- Herman Fishman (1917–1967), American basketball player and baseball player
- Herman Goldstein (1939–2020), American criminologist
- Herman Goldstine (1913–2004), American mathematician and computer scientist
- Herman "Hank" Greenspun, publisher of the Las Vegas Sun newspaper
- Herman Haupt (1817–1905), American railway engineer
- Herman W. Hellman (1843–1906), German-born American Jewish businessman
- Herman Hill (1945–1970), American baseball player
- Herman Johannes (1912–1992), Indonesian professor, scientist, and politician
- Herman José (born 1954), Portuguese showman, singer, and comedian
- Herman Leenders (born 1960), Flemish writer and poet
- Herman Li (李康敏 Lǐ Kāng Mǐn, born 1976), Chinese musician
- Herman Lieberman (1870–1941), Polish lawyer and politician
- Herman Long (disambiguation), multiple people
- Herman J. Mankiewicz (1897–1953), American screenwriter
- Herman Keh (郭坤耀, born 1996), Singaporean actor and model
- Herman Francis Mark (1895–1992), Austrian-American chemist
- Herman Meinich (1868–1948), Norwegian government official
- Herman Melville (1819–1891), American novelist
- Herman A. Metz (1867–1934), German-born American U.S. Representative from New York and New York City Comptroller and businessman
- Herman Miller (Wisconsin politician) (1833–1922), American politician
- Herman Miller (writer) (1919–1999), American screenwriter and film producer
- Herman Parmentier (born 1947), Belgian long-distance runner
- Herman Redemeijer (1930–2020), Dutch politician
- Herman Salmon (1913–1980), American barnstormer, air racer, and test pilot
- Herman Shaw (1892–1950), British geophysicist and museum director
- Herman Leonard de Silva (1928–2009), Permanent Representative of Sri Lanka to the United Nations
- Herman Slater (1938–1992), American Wiccan high priest
- Herman Smetanin (born 1992), Ukrainian defense industry management executive
- Herman Stump (1837–1917), American politician
- Herman Suselbeek (born 1943), Dutch rower
- Herman Terrado (born 1989), Guam-born American mixed martial artist
- Herman van Bekkum (1932–2020), Dutch chemist
- Herman Van der Wee (born 1928), Belgian economic historian
- Herman van Praag (born 1929), Dutch psychiatrist
- Herman Claudius van Riemsdijk (born 1948), Brazilian chess player
- Herman Van Rompuy (born 1947), Belgian politician, first President of the European Council
- Herman Van Springel (1943–2022), Belgian cyclist
- Herman van Veen (born 1945), Dutch stage performer, actor, musician, singer/songwriter and author
- Herman Vedel (1875–1948), Danish painter
- Herman Wirth (1885–1981), Dutch-German lay historian and scholar
- Herman Wouk (1915–2019), American author
- Herman Zetterberg (1904–1963), Swedish jurist and politician

Stage name

- Peter Noone (born 1947), English singer-songwriter and actor, stage name Herman as leader of the pop group Herman's Hermits

== Fictional characters ==
- Herman Hermann, a one-armed character from the American television sitcom The Simpsons
- Hermine, a character from the novel Steppenwolf
- Herman Munster, from American television sitcom The Munsters
- Herman Toothrot, from LucasArts' Monkey Island
- Herman Brooks, the titular character of the American television sitcom Herman's Head
- Herman the mouse, created by American animation studio Famous Studios (a.k.a. Paramount Cartoon Studios)
- Herman Schultz aka Shocker, from Marvel Comics

== As a surname ==
Variants include Herrmann, Herrman, Herman, Hermann, Hermanns

=== Disambiguation lists ===
- Edward Herman (disambiguation)
- Michael Herman (disambiguation)
- Robert Herman (disambiguation)
- Tom Herman (disambiguation)

=== Early modern ===
- Augustine Herman (1621–1686), Bohemian explorer of North America
- Jakob Hermann (1678–1733), Swiss mathematician
- Nikolaus Herman (c.1500–1561), German cantor and hymn writer

=== Modern ===
- Alexis Herman (1947–2025), American political figure
- Arthur L. Herman (born 1956), American historian
- Babe Herman (1903–1987), Major League Baseball right fielder
- Barbara Herman (born 1945), American philosopher
- Billy Herman (1909–1992), Major League Baseball second baseman
- Cila Herman, Yugoslav-American thermal engineer
- David Herman (born 1967), American actor
- D. J. Herman (born 2002), American football player
- Faithe Herman, American actress
- Hanna Herman (born 1959), Ukrainian state and political activist
- Henry Herman, pen name of Henry Heydrac D'Arco (1832–1894), English dramatist and novelist
- Jerry Herman (1931–2019), American composer
- Josef Herman (1911–2000), Polish-British painter
- Josephine Herman, Cook Islander physician
- Louis Herman (1930–2016), American marine biologist
- M. Justin Herman (1909–1971), American public administrator; Executive Director of the San Francisco Redevelopment Agency
- Oskar Herman (1886–1974), Croatian painter
- Ottó Herman (1835–1914), Hungarian zoologist, ethnographer, archaeologist, and politician
- Robin Herman (1951–2022), American sports journalist
- Róża Herman (1902–1995), Polish chess master
- Vilim Herman (born 1949), Croatian university professor, politician and former representative in the Croatian Parliament
- Woody Herman (1913–1987), American jazz clarinetist and big band leader
- Yaron Herman (born 1981), Israeli jazz pianist

=== Fictional characters ===
- Pee-wee Herman, played by Paul Reubens

== See also ==
- Herman (disambiguation)
- Hermann (name)
- Herm (given name)
- Hermans
- Harman (surname)
- Arman (name)
- Armand (name)
- Armin (name)
- Germain (disambiguation)
- Germán
- German (name)
- Germanus (disambiguation)
