= Arman (given name) =

Arman (Persian: آرمان, Ārmān), from Middle Persian 𐭠𐭫𐭬𐭭𐭩 (Armin) from Armenian language Արման,from Russian language Арман, from Old Persian 𐎠𐎼𐎷𐎡𐎴 is a masculine Persian given name meaning “wish” and “hope.”

This name also has roots in Armenian "will", “purpose,” Turkish "examination, wish”, German “man in the army”.

== People ==
- Arman (actor) (1921–1980), Iranian-Armenian actor, film director, and producer
- Arman Adikyan (b. 1984), Armenian Greco-Roman wrestler
- Arman Alizad (b. 1971), Iranian-Finnish master tailor, fashion columnist, and TV personality
- Arman Arian (b. 1981), Iranian writer
- Arman Dunayev, Kazakhstani politician
- Arman Chilmanov (b. 1984), Kazakhstani taekwondo athlete
- Arman Geghamyan (b. 1981), Armenian Greco-Roman wrestler
- Arman Ghasemi (b. 1989), Iranian association football player
- Arman Hall (b. 1994), American sprinter
- Arman Hossain (b. 1983), Bangladeshi cricketer
- Arman İnci (b. 1991), Turkish-German actor
- Arman Kamyshev (b. 1991), Kazakhstani road race cyclist
- Arman Karamyan (b. 1979), Armenian-Romanian associated football player
- Arman Kirakossian (1956–2019), Armenian diplomat and historian
- Arman Loni (1983–2019), Pashtun human rights activist
- Arman Manaryan (1929–2016), Iranian-born Armenian film director
- Arman Manukyan (1931–2012), Turkish professor, writer, and economist
- Arman Mehaković (b. 1988), Bosnian association football player
- Arman Manookian (1904–1931), Armenian-American painter
- Arman Parvez Murad, Bangladeshi actor
- Arman Pashikian (b. 1987), Armenian chess player
- Arman Ramezani, Iranian association football player
- Arman Tsarukyan, Armenian mixed martial arts fighter
- Arman Sadeghi (b. 1977), American entrepreneur
- Arman Sedghi (b. 1964), Iranian engineer and assistant professor
- Arman Serebrakian (b. 1987), Armenian alpine skier
- Arman Shahdadnejad (b. 1989), Iranian association football player
- Arman Smailov (b. 1981), Kazakhstani rally driver
- Arman Yeremyan (b. 1986), Armenian taekwondo athlete
- Arman Zangeneh (b. 1993), Iranian basketball player
- Arman Zhetpisbayev (b. 1971), Kazakhstani politician
- Arman-Marshall Silla (b. 1994), Belarusian taekwondo athlete

== See also ==
- Armağan (name)
- Armand (name)
- Arman (disambiguation)
- Arman (surname)
