= Amani =

Amani may refer to:

== Language ==
- Amani, peace in Swahili Language
- Amani, (أماني) aspiration (as in wish) in Arabic

== Places ==
- Amani, Greece, municipality on the island of Chios
- Amani, Hormozgan, a village in Iran
- Amani, Muheza, an administrative ward in Tanga Region, Tanzania
- Amani Constituency, a parliamentary constituency on Zanzibar, Tanzania
- Amani High School, Kabul, Afghanistan
- Amani Nature Reserve, Tanzania

== People ==
- Amani (musician) (born 1980), Kenyan singer
- Amani Aguinaldo (born 1995), Filipino footballer
- Amani Al-Khatahtbeh (born 1992), American author and tech entrepreneur
- Amani Ayed (born 2006), Swedish-Tunisian footballer
- Amani Ballour (born 1987), Syrian pediatrician and subject of The Cave
- Amani Bledsoe (born 1998), American football player
- Amani Hooker (born 1998), American football player
- Amani Lewis (born 1994), American artist
- Amani Oruwariye (born 1996), American football player
- Amani Toomer (born 1974), American football player

== Other uses ==
- Abeid Amani Karume International Airport, Zanzibar, Tanzania
- Amani sunbird, species of bird
- "Amani" character on the animated television series The New Archies
- "Amani", 1991 song by Hong Kong rock band Beyond
- Amani, equal to 20 afghani

== See also ==
- Armani (disambiguation)
