= Armon (surname) =

Armon is a surname of several possible origins. It may be a variant of one of the names Armand or Armond. It is also the Hebrew word (Hebrew: אַרְמוֹן) meaning "palace", "castle". Notable people with the surname include:

- Dan Armon, Israeli poet
- Joe Armon-Jones, British musician
- Naama Armon, Israeli actress
