= Armand =

Armand refer to:

== People ==
- Armand (name), list of people with this name
- Armand (photographer) (1901–1963), Armenian photographer
- Armand (singer) (1946–2015), Dutch protest singer
- Sean Armand (born 1991), American basketball player
- Armand, duc d'Aiguillon (1750–1800), French noble
- Armand of Kersaint (1742–1793), French sailor and politician

== Places ==
- Saint-Armand, Quebec, Canada
- Armand, Iran, a village in Khanmirza County
- Armand-e Sofla, Iran
- Armand Rural District, Iran
- St. Armand, New York
- St. Armand's Key in Florida
- Armand-Jude River, a river in Charlevoix Regional County Municipality, Capitale-Nationale, Quebec, Canada

== See also ==
- Arman (disambiguation)
- Armand (film), 2024 film
- Armand Commission, first commission of the European Atomic Energy Community
- Armand de Brignac, champagne brand produced by Champagne Cattier
- Armand's Legion, Continental Army military unit
- St Armand (disambiguation)
