= Ermanno (given name) =

- Gender: Male

Origin
- Origin: Germanic languages
- Meaning: army's man
- Region of origin: Northern Europe

Other names
- Related names: Hermann, Herman, Armando, Armands, Armand
- Popularity: see popular names

Ermanno is an Italian masculine given name. It is a variant of the name Herman.

People bearing the name include:

- Ermanno Stradelli (1852–1926), Italian explorer, geographer and photographer
- Ermanno Wolf-Ferrari (1876–1948), Italian composer and teacher
- Ermanno Aebi (1892–1976), Italian-Swiss footballer
- Ermanno Bazzocchi (1914–2015), Italian aeronautical engineer and designer
- Ermanno Randi (1920–1951), Italian film actor
- Ermanno Gorrieri (1920–2004), Italian politician and economist
- Ermanno Pignatti (1921–1995), Italian weightlifter
- Ermanno Rea (1927–2016), Italian novelist, essayist and journalist
- Ermanno Olmi (1931–2018), Italian film director and screenwriter
- Ermanno Corsi (1939–2025), Italian journalist and writer
- Ermanno Mauro (b. 1939), Italian-Canadian operatic tenor
- Ermanno Fasoli (1943–2025), Italian boxer
- Ermanno Daelli, Italian fashion designer
- Ermanno Capelli (b. 1985), Italian road racing cyclist
