= Armağan =

Armağan may refer to:

- Armağan (name), list of people with the name
- Armağan Dam, dam in Kırklareli Province, Turkey
- Armağan, Kemaliye, village in Erzincan, Turkey
- Armağan, Ardeşen, village in Rize, Turkey
