= List of people associated with Nuffield College, Oxford =

This is a list of notable people affiliated with Nuffield College, University of Oxford, England. It includes former students, current and former academics and fellows. When available, year of matriculation is provided in parentheses, as listed in the Oxford Dictionary of National Biography.

== Former students ==
=== Politicians and public officials ===
- Alan Beith, Baron Beith, Deputy Leader of the Liberal Democrats, 1992–2003
- Richard Bruton, Minister for Education and Skills of Ireland, 2016–2018; Deputy Leader of Fine Gael, 2002–2010
- Kofi Abrefa Busia, Prime Minister of Ghana, 1969–1972
- Mark Carney, Prime Minister of Canada, 2025-present; former Governor of the Bank of England, 2013–2020; former Governor of the Bank of Canada, 2008–2013
- Donald Chapman, Baron Northfield, Member of Parliament for Birmingham, Northfield
- Gamani Corea, former Secretary-General of the United Nations Conference on Trade and Development and Under-Secretary-General of the United Nations
- Barun De, chairman, West Bengal Heritage Commission, India, 2008–2011
- Harold Edwards, Member of the Australian House of Representatives for the Division of Berowra
- John Fforde, Chief Cashier of the Bank of England, 1966–1970
- Geoff Gallop, former Premier of Western Australia, 2001–2006
- Patricia Hewitt, British Secretary of State for Health 2005–2007
- Kamal Hossain, Law and Foreign Minister of Bangladesh, 1972–73 and 1973–75
- Austin Mitchell, Labour Member of Parliament, 1977–2015
- Derek Morris, former Chairman of the UK Competition Commission
- Gus O'Donnell, Baron O'Donnell, Cabinet Secretary and Head of the Home Civil Service, 2005–2011
- Prabhat Patnaik, Deputy Chairman, Kerala Planning Commission, India
- Muhammad Habibur Rahman, Chief Justice of Bangladesh, 1995
- Manmohan Singh, Prime Minister of India, 2004–2014
- Robert Skidelsky, Member of the House of Lords
- Norman Warner, Baron Warner, life peer and former minister and civil servant
- John Fingleton, former head, Office of Fair Trading, 2005–2012
- Swapan Dasgputa, Finance Minister of West Bengal, 2026–Present

=== Academics ===
- Franklin Allen, Professor of Finance and Economics at the Wharton School
- Patrick Baert, Professor of Social Theory at the University of Cambridge
- James Belich, Beit Professor of Commonwealth History, University of Oxford
- Jagdish Bhagwati (1957), University Professor at Columbia University
- Vernon Bogdanor, Research Professor, Institute for Contemporary British History, King's College London
- Simon Caney, Professor of Political Theory, Magdalen College, Oxford
- Colin Crouch, emeritus Professor at the International Centre for Governance and Public Management, University of Warwick
- John Curtice, Professor of Politics, University of Strathclyde
- Huw Dixon, Professor of Economics, Cardiff Business School
- Robert Falkner, Professor of International Relations, LSE
- Martin Feldstein, George F. Baker Professor of Economics, Harvard University
- John Flemming, Warden of Wadham College, Oxford, 1993–2003
- Amelia Fletcher, Chief Economist, Office of Fair Trading, 2001–2013, and singer-songwriter
- Sir Lawrence Freedman, emeritus professor of war studies at King's College London; member of the Iraq Inquiry
- Norman Geras, professor emeritus of Government, University of Manchester, UK
- Alan Gilbert, Vice-Chancellor of the University of Manchester, UK
- Leslie Green, Professor of Philosophy of Law, Oxford University
- Jerry A. Hausman, John and Jennie S. MacDonald Professor of Economics at Massachusetts Institute of Technology
- Gareth Stedman Jones, historian of England
- John Kay, British economist and columnist
- Ruth Kinna, Professor of Political Theory, Loughborough University
- Jonathan Levin, American economist; President of Stanford University, 2024–
- Barry Nalebuff, Milton Steinbach Professor of Management, SOM, Yale University
- Gyanendra Pandey, Professor of History, Emory University
- Neil Shephard, Professor of Economics and of Statistics, Harvard University
- Hyun Song Shin, Hughes-Rogers Professor of Economics, Princeton University
- Richard Smethurst, Provost of Worcester College, Oxford
- Susan J. Smith, Mistress of Girton College, Cambridge and Honorary Professor of Social and Economic Geography at the Department of Geography, University of Cambridge
- Nicholas Stern, Baron Stern of Brentford, President of the British Academy; former World Bank Chief Economist and author of the Stern Review
- Rick Trainor, Principal of King's College London
- Sir Alan Walters, British economist
- Sharon White, British economist
- Martin Wolf, chief economics correspondent of the Financial Times

== Fellows ==
A more complete list is available at Category:Fellows of Nuffield College, Oxford

- Bob Allen, economic historian
- Sir Tony Atkinson, economist
- Martin Browning, economist
- Sir David Butler, politics
- Sir David Cox, statistics
- Jean Floud, sociologist, fellow (1962–1971)
- Diego Gambetta, sociologist
- John Goldthorpe, sociologist
- Anthony Heath, sociologist
- Peter Hedstrom, sociologist
- Sir David Forbes Hendry, economist
- Paul Klemperer, economist
- David Miller, political philosopher
- Sir Stephen Nickell, economist
- Dame Margery Perham, African affairs, first woman fellow (1939–1963)
- Tom Snijders, statistician

=== Former fellows ===
- Andrew Adonis, Baron Adonis, former Secretary of State for Transport
- Brian Barry
- Hugh Clegg
- Swapan Dasgupta, Indian journalist and Member of Parliament; Junior Research Fellow
- Taslim Olawale Elias, former President of the International Court of Justice
- Martin Feldstein, now an honorary fellow
- W. M. Gorman
- Michael Herman, founder of the Oxford Intelligence Group
- Sir John Hicks, Nobel in Economics, died in 1989
- Sir James Mirrlees, Nobel in Economics, now an emeritus fellow
- Michael Oakeshott
- Avner Offer
- John Plamenatz, Research Fellow, 1951–1967
- Ariel Rubinstein, now an honorary fellow
- Amartya Sen, Nobel in Economics, now an honorary fellow
- Manmohan Singh, now an honorary fellow
- Sir John Vickers, British economist and chair of the Independent Commission on Banking
