= Armands =

Male given name

- Gender: Male
- Language: Latvian
- Name day: 22 April

Origin
- Region of origin: Latvia

Other names
- Related names: Armand, Armando

Armands is a Latvian masculine given name. People bearing the name Armands include:

- Armands Ābols (born 1973), Latvian pianist
- Armands Bērziņš (born 1983), Latvian ice hockey player
- Armands Celitāns (born 1984), Latvian volleyball player
- Armands Krauliņš (born 1939), Latvian basketball coach
- Armands Ližbovskis (born 19??), Latvian track and field Paralympian athlete
- Armands Šķēle (born 1983), Latvian basketball player
- Armands Zeiberliņš (born 1965), Latvian footballer and manager
- Armands Zvirbulis (born 1987), Latvian freestyle wrestler.
