= Armaan =

Armaan may refer to:

== Films ==
- Armaan (1942 film), an Indian drama film by Kidar Nath Sharma
- Armaan (1953 film), an Indian Hindi-language romantic drama film by Fali Mistry
- Armaan (1966 film), a Pakistani film starring Waheed Murad
- Armaan (1981 film), an Indian Hindi-language romance film by Anand Sagar, starring Raj Babbar and Shammi Kapoor
- Armaan (2003 film), an Indian Hindi-language drama film by Honey Irani, starring Amitabh Bachchan, Anil Kapoor, Preity Zinta and Gracy Singh
- Armaan (2013 film), a Pakistani film starring Fawad Khan and Aamina Sheikh
- Armaan (2017 film), an Indian Gujarati-language film starring Poojan Trivedi, Alisha Parjapati, Netri Trivedi
- Armaan Ikramullah, fictional character from the 2000 Indian film Fiza, played by Hrithik Roshan

== People with the given name ==
- Armaan Ebrahim (born 1989), Indian racing driver
- Armaan Franklin (born 2000), American basketball player
- Armaan Jaffer (born 1998), Indian cricketer
- Armaan Khan (cricketer) (born 1980), Pakistani cricketer
- Armaan Khan (Politician), Indian politician
- Armaan Kohli (born 1972), Indian actor
- Armaan Malik (born 1995), Indian singer
- Armaan Qureshi (born 1995), Indian field hockey player
- Armaan Wilson (born 2002), Canadian soccer player
- Armaan Zorace (born 1983), Indian filmmaker

== See also ==
- Arman (disambiguation)
