= Arman (disambiguation) =

Arman (1928–2005) was a French-American artist.

Arman may also refer to:

- Arman (given name)
- Arman (surname)

== Places ==
- Arman, Nepal, a village in the Dhaulagiri Zone of Nepal
- Arman, Russia, a rural locality (a settlement) in Magadan Oblast, Russia
- Arman (river), a river in Russia
- Arman (Crișul Negru), a river in Romania
- Arman, the Romanian name of Kardam, Dobrich Province, Bulgaria
- Armān, alternative name of Armand-e Olya, a village in Chaharmahal and Bakhtiari Province of Iran

== Other ==
- Archaeal Richmond Mine acidophilic nanoorganisms (ARMAN), the archaeal phylum
- Arman (cinema), in Almaty, Kazakhstan
- Arman FM, an entertainment commercial radio station in Afghanistan
- FC Arman, a defunct Kazakhstani association football team
- Arman oil field, an oil field in Kazakhstan
- Arman Monthly, Australian monthly publication serving the Afghani community

== See also ==
- Ahriman (disambiguation)
- Arimanius
- Armaan (disambiguation)
- Armand (disambiguation)
- Armani (disambiguation)
