= Armon (given name) =

Hebrew male given name

Armon is a name of several possible origins. It may be a variant of one of the names Armand or Armond. It is also the Hebrew word (Hebrew: אַרְמוֹן) meaning "palace", "castle". Notable people with the given name include:

- Armon Ben-Naim, Israeli professional association football player
- Armon Bassett, American former professional basketball player
- Armon Binns, American football wide receiver
- Armon Johnson, American professional basketball player
- Armen Gilliam (born Armon Louis Gilliam), American professional basketball player
- Armon Hatcher (born 1976), American football player
- Armon Trick, retired German international rugby union player
- Armon Watts (born 1996), American football player
- Armon Williams (born 1973), American football player
- Edward Armon Sieker (c. 1853–1901), lawman with the Texas Rangers
- Thomas Armon Pridgen, American drummer

== Fictional characters ==
- Armon, one of the lead characters of Mummies Alive!
- Armon Gill, also known as the Chief Judge's Man, a fictional villain from the Judge Dredd comic strip
