= Armond =

Armond may refer to:

== Given name ==
- Armond Armstead (born 1990), American football player
- Armond J. Berthelot (1894–1961), French World War I flying ace credited with eleven confirmed aerial victories
- Armond Budish (born 1953), Democratic representative for the 8th district of the Ohio House of Representatives
- Armond H. DeLalio (1917–1952), American Marine helicopter pilot and Navy Cross recipient
- Armond Duck Chief, Canadian singer-songwriter
- Armond Fields (1930–2008), American artist and author
- Armond Hill (born 1953), American basketball coach and retired basketball player
- Armond Lebowitz (1926–2015), American film editor
- Armond Rizzo (born 1990), American gay pornographic film actor
- Armond Seidler (1919–2017), American educator and inventor
- Armond Smith (born 1986), American football player
- Armond White (born 1953), New York-based film and music critic
- Mario Armond Zamparelli (1921–2012), American artist and designer, best known for his connection with Howard Hughes

== Surname ==
- Alexis de Armond (born 1997), Canadian field hockey player
- Charlie DeArmond (1877–1933), American baseball player
- Dale DeArmond (1914–2006), American printmaker
- Dana DeArmond (born 1979), American pornographic film actress
- David A. De Armond (1844–1909), Democratic Representative representing Missouri's 12th congressional district
- Edward Harrison DeArmond (1878–1948), United States Army officer
- Harvey H. DeArmond (1884–1970), American attorney, judge, and Oregon state legislator
- R. N. DeArmond (1911–2010), American historian of Alaska

== Places ==
- Armond, New Brunswick, Canadian community in Carleton County, New Brunswick

== See also ==
- Armand
