= Armando =

Armando may refer to:

- Armando (given name)
- Armando (artist) (1929–2018), the name used by Dutch artist Herman Dirk van Dodeweerd
- Armando (producer) (1970–1996), Chicago house producer
- Armando (album), studio album by rapper Pitbull
- Armando (Planet of the Apes), a fictional character
- Armando (footballer), retired Portuguese defender
