= Sedghi =

Sedghi is a surname. Notable people with the surname include:

- Amir Hossein Sedghi (born 1996), Iranian footballer
- Arman Sedghi (born 1964), Iranian engineer and professor
- Hassan Sedghi, Iranian academic
- Kazem Sedghi, Iranian fighter pilot
- Hojjat Sedghi (born 1993), Iranian footballer
- Zubin Sedghi (born 16 September 1984) Persian-American neuroscientist, musical artist, and member of the Michigan band Tally Hall.
