= St Armand =

St-Armand, St. Armand, Saint Armand, or variation, may refer to:

== People ==
- Saint Herman (disambiguation), aka Saint Armand
- Barton Levi St. Armand, professor of literature

== Places ==
- Saint-Armand, Quebec, Canada
- St. Armand, New York, USA
- St. Armand's Key in Florida, USA

== See also ==
- Armand (name)
- Armand (disambiguation)
