= Armani (name) =

- Pronunciation: Italian pronunciation: [arˈmaːni]
- Gender: Unisex

Origin
- Origin: Italian and English via Persian, Hebrew

Other names
- Related names: Armony, Armonie, Armonee

Armani (or spelled Armoni, Armony, Armonie, and Armonee) is an Italian given name or surname.

== Surname ==
- Abgar Ali Akbar Armani, Armenian of the Safavid Empire
- Amir Beg Armani, 17th-century Safavid official
- Andrea Armani, American professor at the Viterbi School of Engineering at USC
- Eduardo Armani, Argentine violinist and conductor
- Franco Armani, Argentine football player
- Giorgio Armani (1934–2025) Italian fashion designer
- Khosrow Soltan Armani, 17th-century Safavid official
- Leandro Armani, Argentine football player
- Luciano Armani (1940–2023), Italian cyclist
- Marco Armani, Italian singer-songwriter
- Nora Armani, actor and filmmaker
- Pier Martire Armani, Italian painter of the Baroque period
- Vincenza Armani, Italian actress

== Given name ==
- Armani Caesar (born 1989), American rapper
- Armani Depaul (born 1988), American rapper and producer
- Armani Little (born 1997), English footballer
- Armani Mahiruddin (born 1957), Malaysian politician
- Armani Moore (born 1994), American basketball player
- Armani Rogers (born 1997), American football player
- Armani Watts (born 1996), American football player
- Armani Williams (born 2000), American stock car racing driver
- Armani White (born 1996), American rapper
- Lil Baby (born Dominique Armani Jones in 1994), American rapper

== See also ==
- Armani (disambiguation)
- Al-Armani, a surname
