= Armone =

Armone is a surname. Notable people with the surname include:

- Joseph Armone (1917–1992), American mobster, brother of Stephen
- Stephen Armone (1899–1960), American mobster

== See also ==
- Armon (disambiguation)
- Arnone
