= Armon =

Armon can refer to:

- Armon (given name), male given name of Hebrew origin
- Armon (surname), surname of Hebrew origin
- Armon (film), a 1986 Uzbekistani film
