= Arman (surname) =

Arman is a surname. Notable people with the surname include:

== People ==
- Abukar Arman, Somali political analyst, writer, and diplomat
- Ali Arman (b. 1983), Bangladeshi cricketer
- Ayşe Arman (b. 1969), Turkish journalist
- Aytaç Arman (1949–2019), Turkish actor
- Birgitta Arman (1921–2007), Swedish actress
- Cihat Arman (1915–1994), Turkish association football player
- Darius Van Arman, American businessman
- Delbar Jan Arman, Afghani politician
- Hiram M. Van Arman (1839–1904), American politician and journalist
- Howard Arman (b. 1954), English choral conductor and opera director
- Lucien Arman (1811–1873), French naval architect and politician
- Sebastiano Arman (b. 1997), Italian curler
- Seyhan Arman (b. 1980), Turkish transgender rights activist, actress, and drag queen
- Yasir Arman (b. 1961), Sudanese politician

== See also ==
- Armando
- Arman (disambiguation)
- Arman (given name)
