= Armağan (name) =

Armağan is a Turkish unisex given name and surname which means gift, reward.

Notable people with the name include:

== Given name ==
=== Male ===
- Armağan Çağlayan (born 1966), Turkish television producer and lawyer
- Armağan Kuş (born 1992), Turkish football player

=== Female ===
- Armağan Ballantyne (born 1972), New Zealand film director

== Surname ==
- Eşref Armağan (born 1953), Turkish painter

== See also ==
- Arman (given name)
