= Pugil stick =

Training weapon

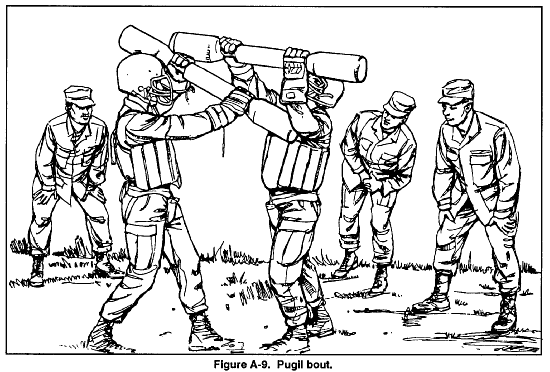
Pugil bouts are a frequent part of combatives training in use of the bayonet.

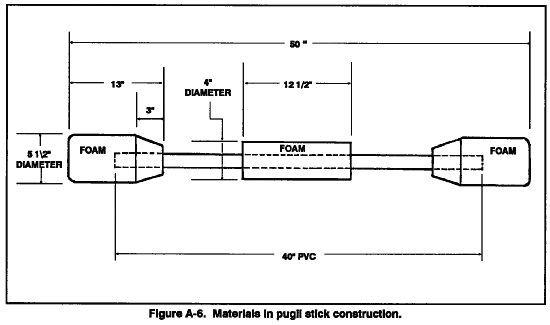
US Army specifications for construction of a pugil stick.

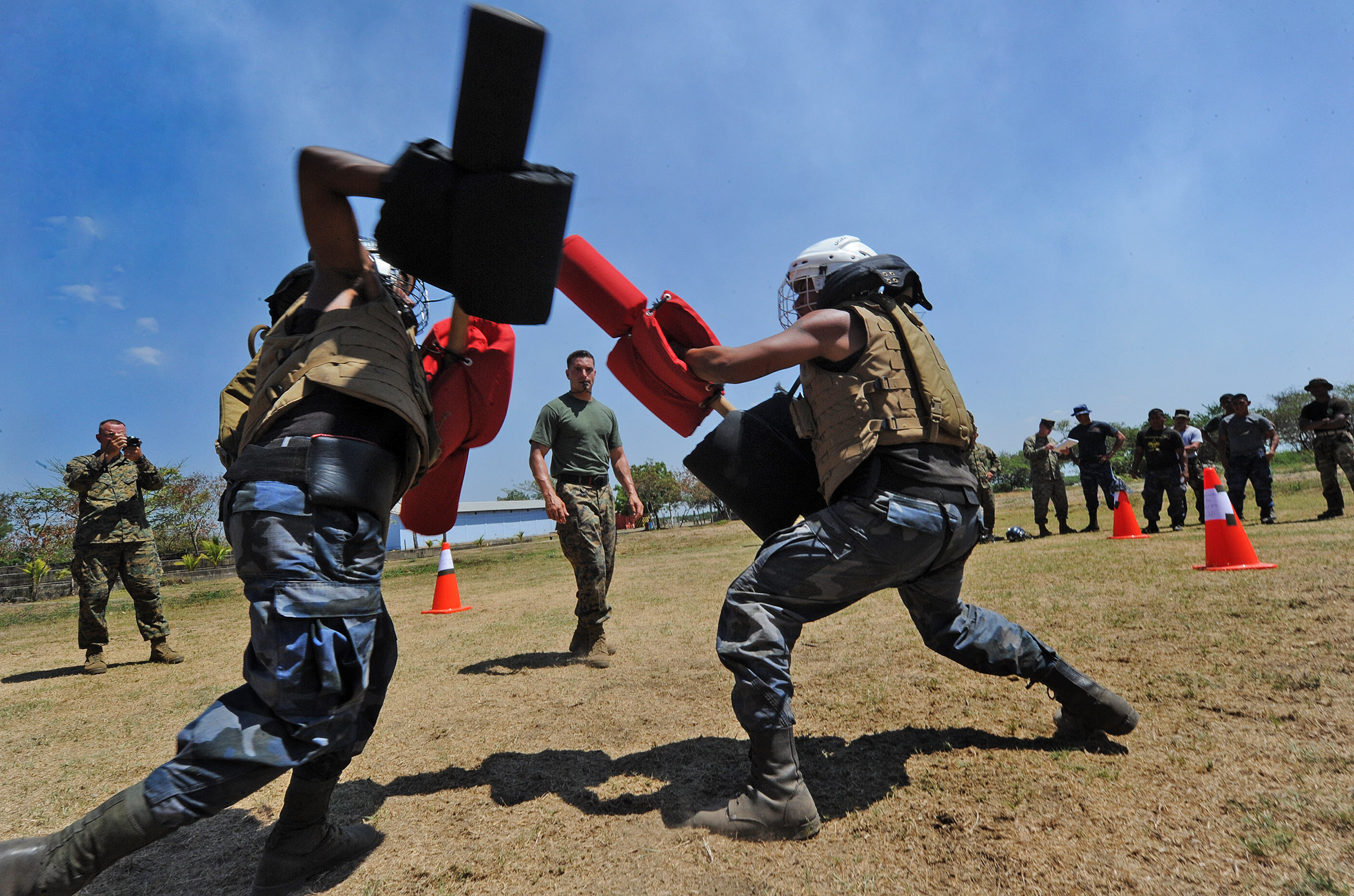
Nicaraguan soldiers training using pugil sticks and protective gear

A pugil stick is a heavily-padded pole-like training weapon that has been used since the mid 1950s by military personnel in training for rifle and bayonet combat. The pugil stick is similar to a quarterstaff or Japanese bo and may be marked to indicate the end that represents the bayonet and the one that is the rifle butt. Dr. Armond H. Seidler, of the University of New Mexico, invented the pugil stick training method in 1955. It was initially adopted by the United States Marine Corps but was later included in United States Army combat training as well.

Pugil bouts are usually conducted with hard contact while wearing protective gear such as groin protectors, American football helmets, hockey gloves, and chest protectors or shin guards, such as those worn by baseball catchers. Some pugil sticks are made with integrated hand guards to reduce the potential for injury. Military procedures for pugil bouts are often detailed, with United States Army and United States Marine Corps both prohibiting pugil training by anyone who has recently suffered concussion of the brain, lest they suffer traumatic brain injury, or has had a tooth extraction within the past 24 hours.

The concept of the military pugil stick bout was adopted by the producers of the American television game show American Gladiators, which used it to create one of the physical events for the series called Joust (no relation to jousting). The object was for competitiors to use the sticks to knock the opponent off a platform.

The name "pugil stick" is a neologism from the Latin noun pugnus (fist), the source for other English words such as "pugilist" (boxer) and "pugnacious" (eager to fight).

== See also ==
- Bayonet
- German school of fencing
- Jōdō
- Jūkendō
- Quarterstaff
