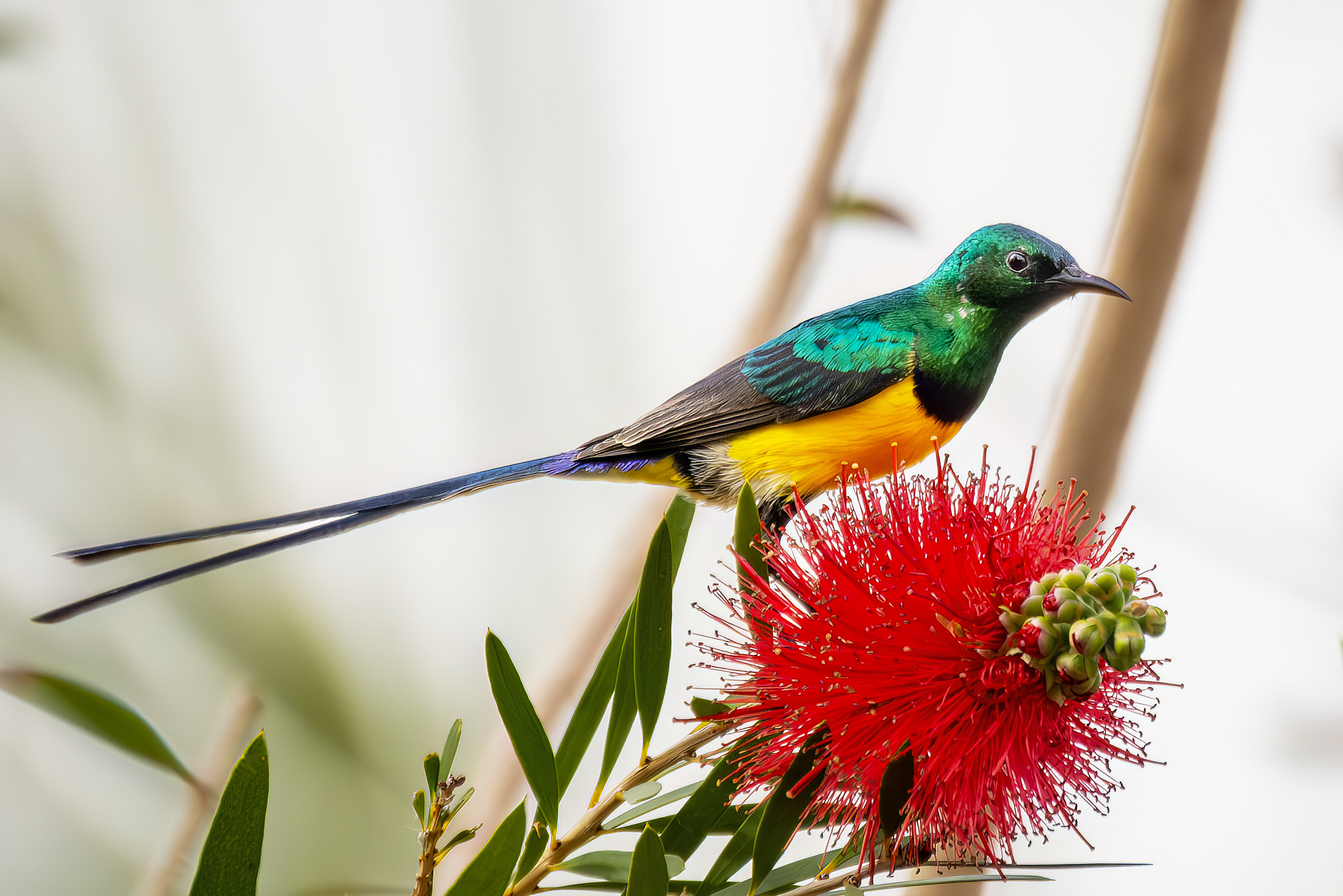
- male
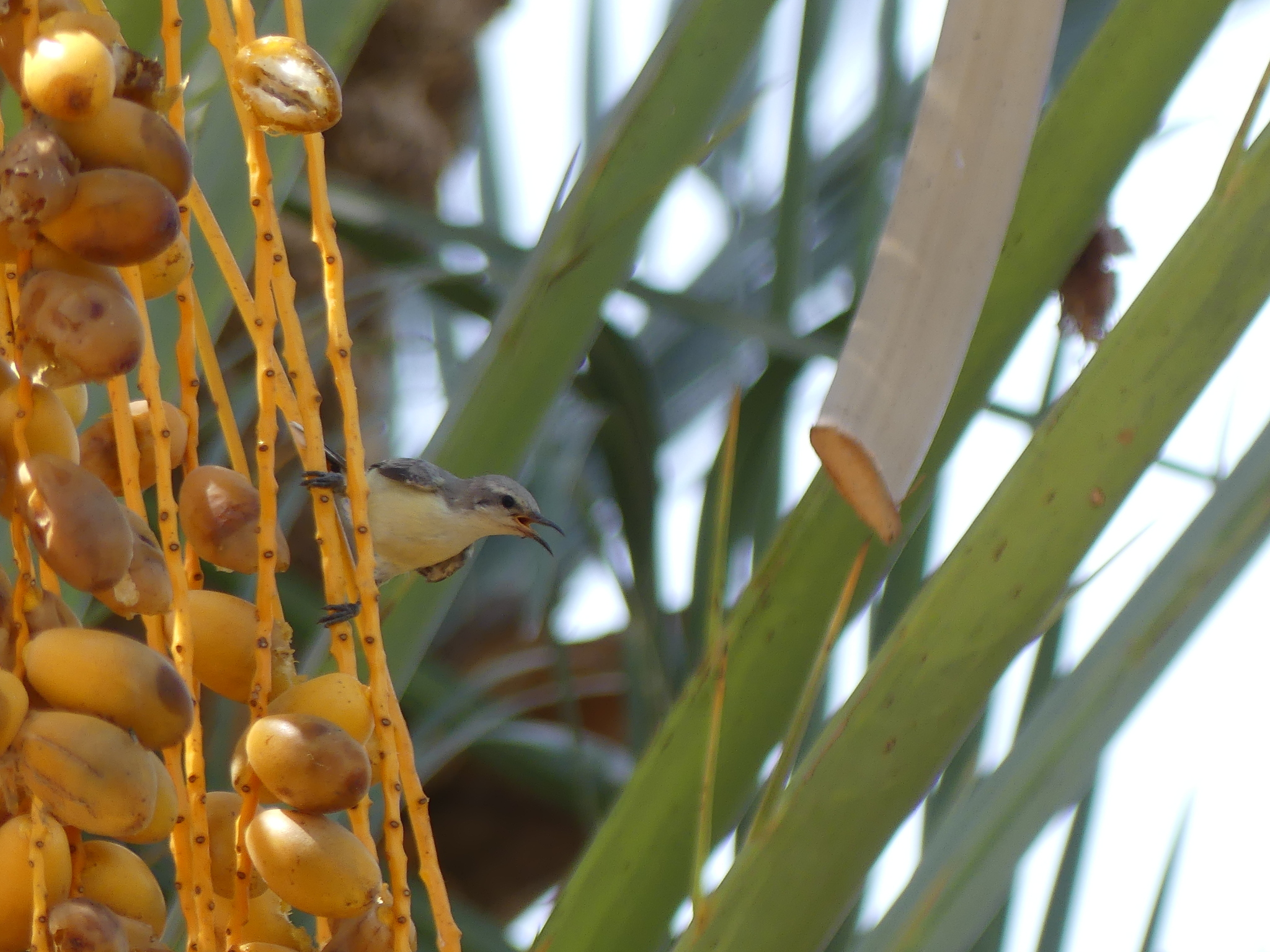
- female

Conservation status
- Least Concern (IUCN 3.1)

Scientific classification
- Kingdom: Animalia
- Phylum: Chordata
- Class: Aves
- Order: Passeriformes
- Family: Nectariniidae
- Genus: Hedydipna
- Species: H. metallica

Binomial name
- Hedydipna metallica (Lichtenstein, MHC, 1823)
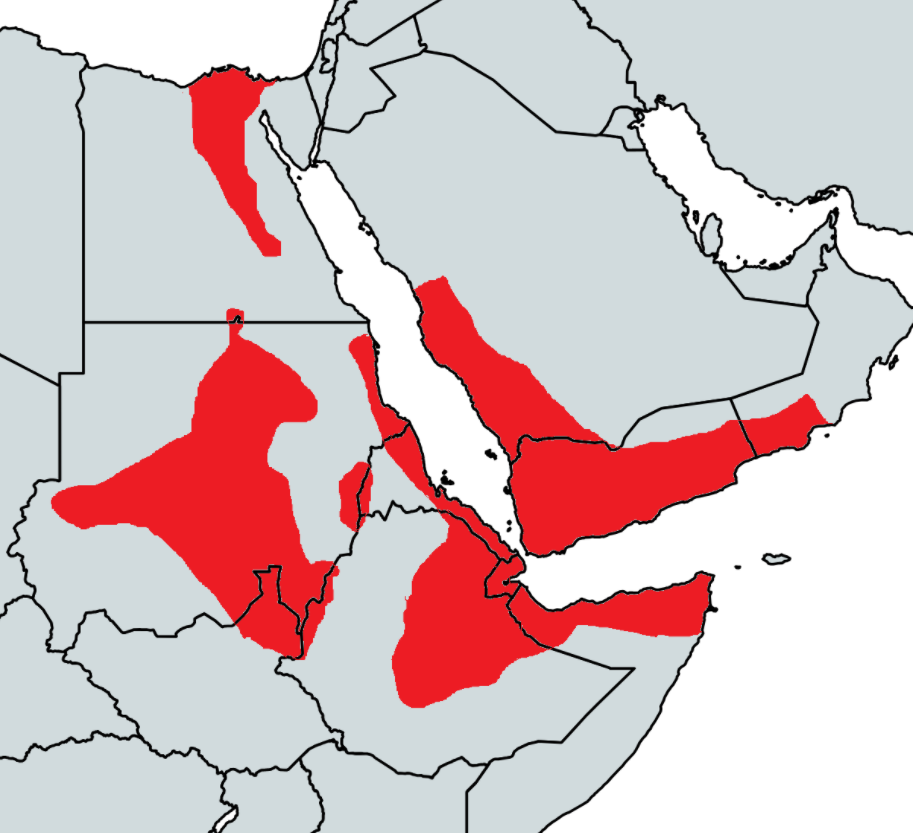

Synonyms
- Anthreptes metallicus Anthodiaeta metallica

= Nile Valley sunbird =

Species of bird

The Nile Valley sunbird (Hedydipna metallica) is a species of bird in the family Nectariniidae. It is found in Djibouti, Egypt, Eritrea, Ethiopia, Rwanda, Oman, Saudi Arabia, Somalia, Sudan, Libya, and Yemen.

In February, the male Nile Valley sunbird assumes his nuptial plumage which he displays in flamboyant fashion. In winter both sexes look alike, tiny, only 9 to 10 cm long, pale grey above and washed-out yellow below, with a long, slender and slightly down-curved bill.

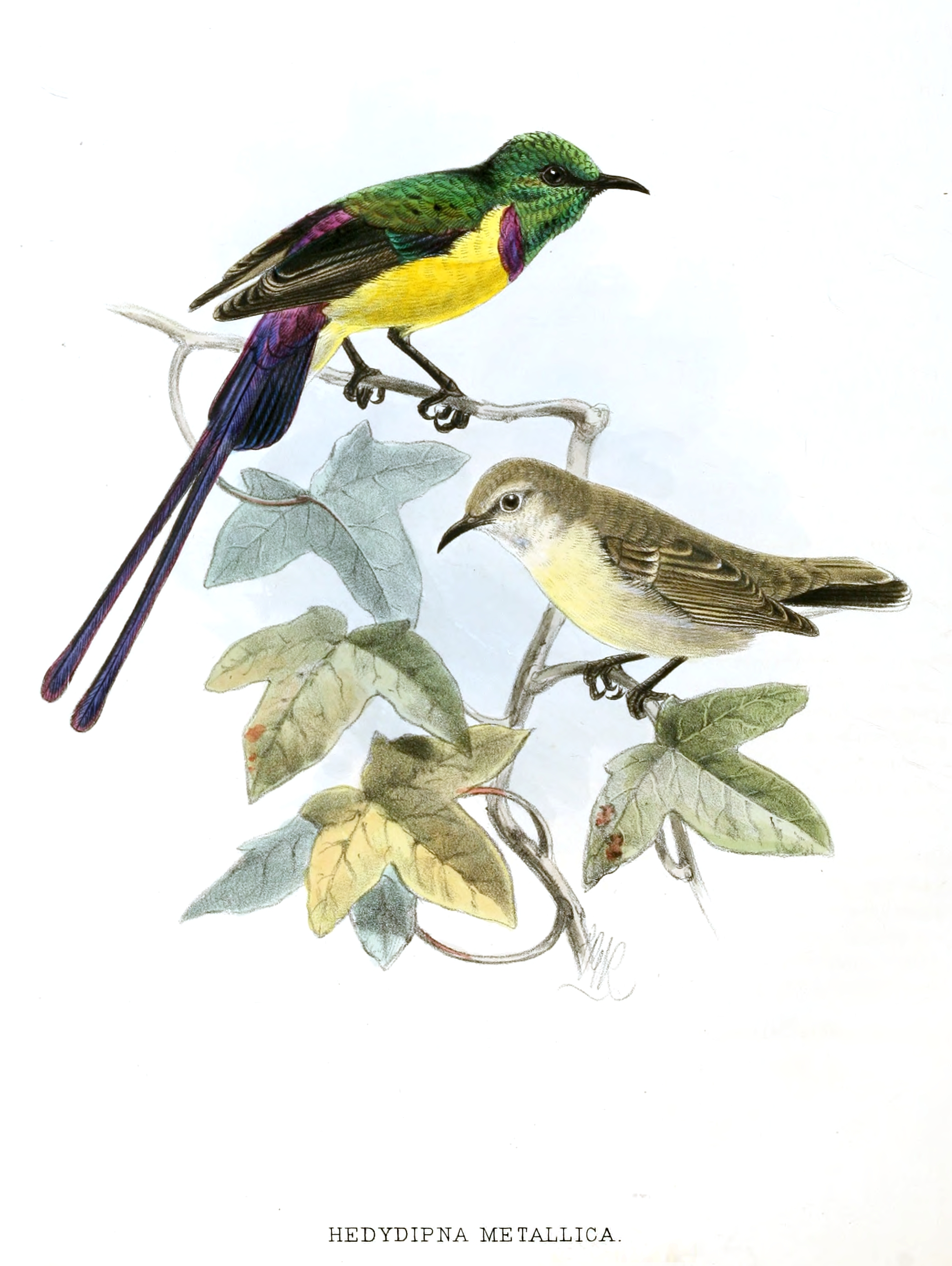

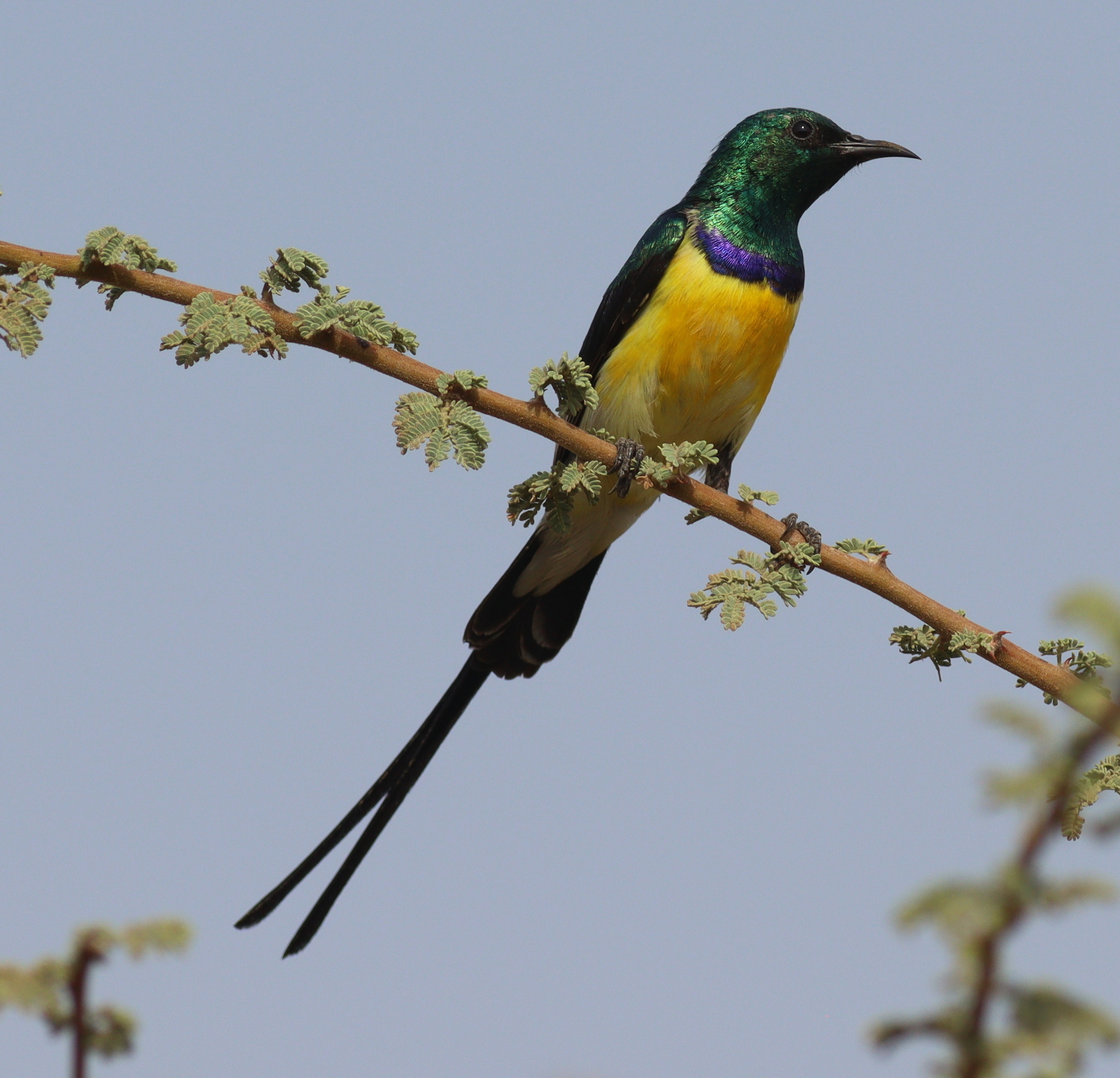
Male, Saudi Arabia

By February the male is transformed into a glossy green extrovert with a brilliant sulfur-yellow belly and long tail streamers that add about an extra five centimetres to his length.

Once transformed, he will be puffing up and parading his newfound finery and courting his duller mate. The display includes a hovering, accompanied by body rocking and wing-whirring.
