= Gundars Celitāns =

Latvian volleyball player (born 1985)

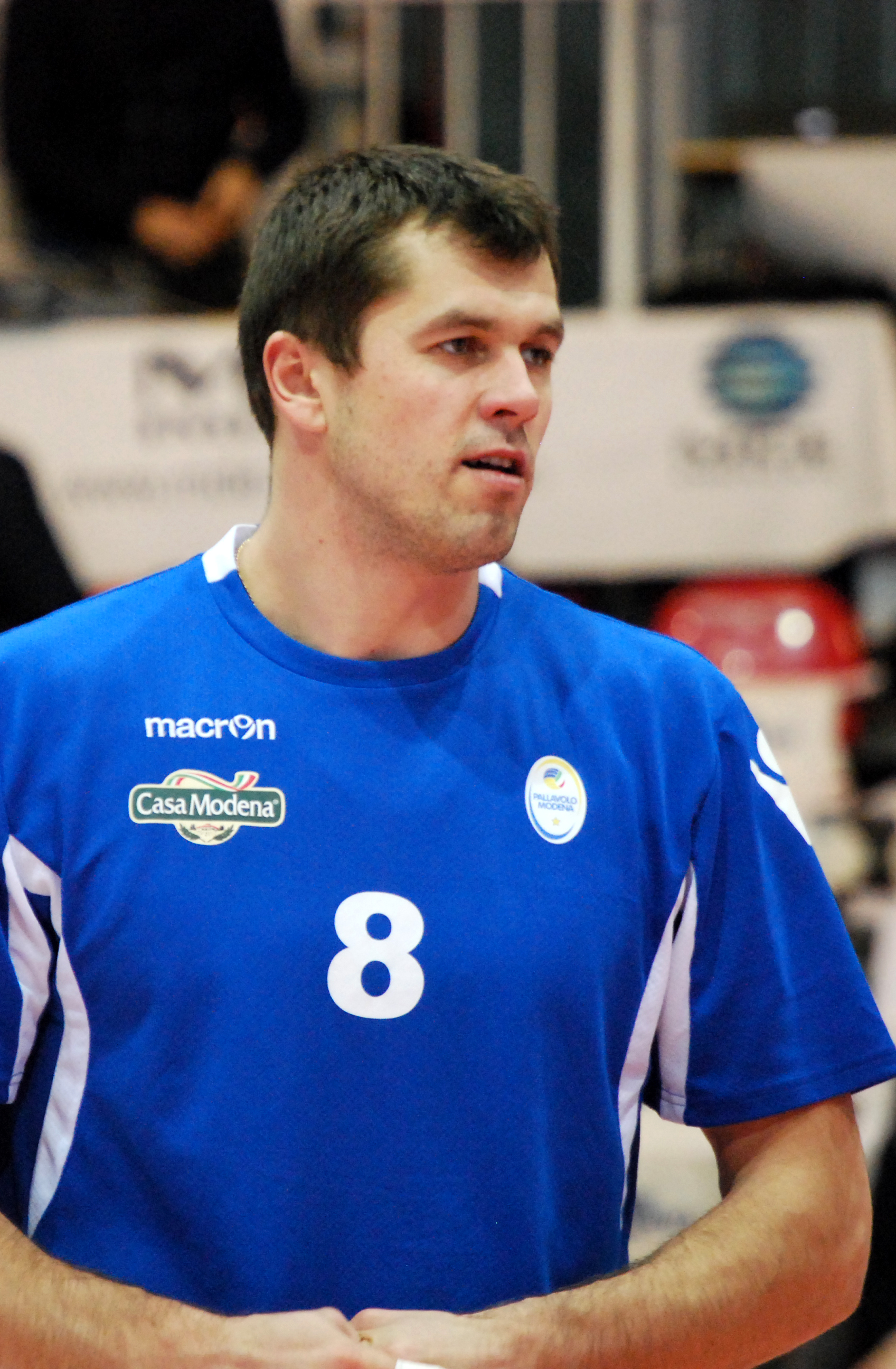

Personal information
- Nationality: Latvian
- Born: 14 June 1985 (age 41) Daugavpils, Latvian SSR, Soviet Union

Volleyball information

National team
- Years: Team
- –: Latvia

Gundars Celitāns (born 14 June 1985) is a Latvian male volleyball player. His brother, Armands Celitāns, is also a volleyball player. Gundars won Best Player in Serie A1 2012-2013.

== Clubs ==
- LASE-R (2004-2007)
- AS Cannes Volley-Ball (2007-2008)
- Halkbank Ankara (2009-2012)
- Modena Volley (2012-2013)
- İstanbul Büyükşehir Belediyesi (2013-2015)
- Seoul Woori Card Hansae (2015–present)
