= Michael Herman =

Michael Herman may refer to:

- Michael Herman (intelligence officer) (1929–2021), British intelligence officer for GCHQ and academic
- Michael Herman (mathematician) (1942–2000), French American mathematician
- Michael E. Herman (born 1943), president of the Kansas City Royals, 1992–2000
