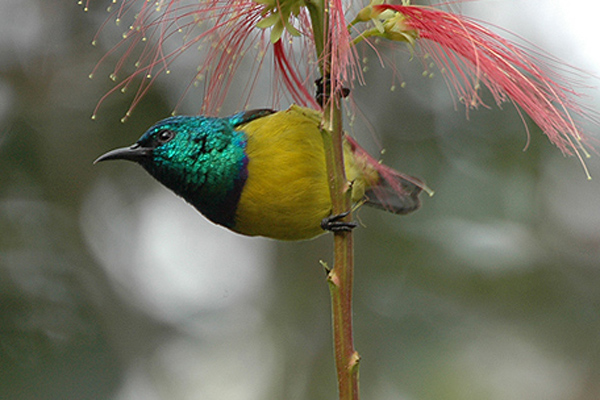
- Collared sunbird, Hedydipna collaris

Scientific classification
- Kingdom: Animalia
- Phylum: Chordata
- Class: Aves
- Order: Passeriformes
- Family: Nectariniidae
- Genus: Hedydipna; Cabanis, 1851

Type species
- Cinnyris platurus Vieillot, 1819

Species
- H. collaris H. platura H. metallica H. pallidigaster

Synonyms
- Anthodiaeta

= Hedydipna =

Genus of birds

Hedydipna is a genus of sunbirds. It contains the following species, which are sometimes included in genus Anthreptes.

Image	Scientific name	Common name	Distribution
	Hedydipna collaris	Collared sunbird	sub-Saharan Africa
	Hedydipna platura	Pygmy sunbird	Benin, Burkina Faso, Cameroon, Central African Republic, Chad, Democratic Republic of the Congo, Ivory Coast, Ethiopia, Gambia, Ghana, Guinea, Guinea-Bissau, Kenya, Mali, Mauritania, Niger, Nigeria, Senegal, Sierra Leone, Sudan, Togo, and Uganda.
	Hedydipna metallica	Nile Valley sunbird	Djibouti, Egypt, Eritrea, Ethiopia, Oman, Saudi Arabia, Somalia, Sudan, Libya, and Yemen
	Hedydipna pallidigaster	Amani sunbird	Kenya and Tanzania

The name Hedydipna comes from the Greek hēdudeipnos, meaning "dainty-supping" or "sweet-eating" — a reference to the nectar sipping habits of these species. These sunbirds are largely restricted to Africa and western islands in the Indian Ocean, though the Nile Valley sunbird is found as far east as Yemen.
