= Armani (disambiguation) =

Armani is an Italian luxury fashion company founded by Giorgio Armani in 1975.

Armani may also refer to:

== Places ==
- Armani (ancient kingdom), an ancient kingdom centered in Aleppo, Syria
- Armani Bolaghi, a village in West Azerbaijan Province, Iran
- Armani Jan, a village in Kermanshah Province, Iran
- Armani Mahalleh, a village in Gilan Province, Iran
- Tall Armani, a village in Isfahan Province, Iran

== Other uses ==
- Armani (name)

== See also ==
- Al-Armani, a surname meaning Armenian or from the region of Armenia
