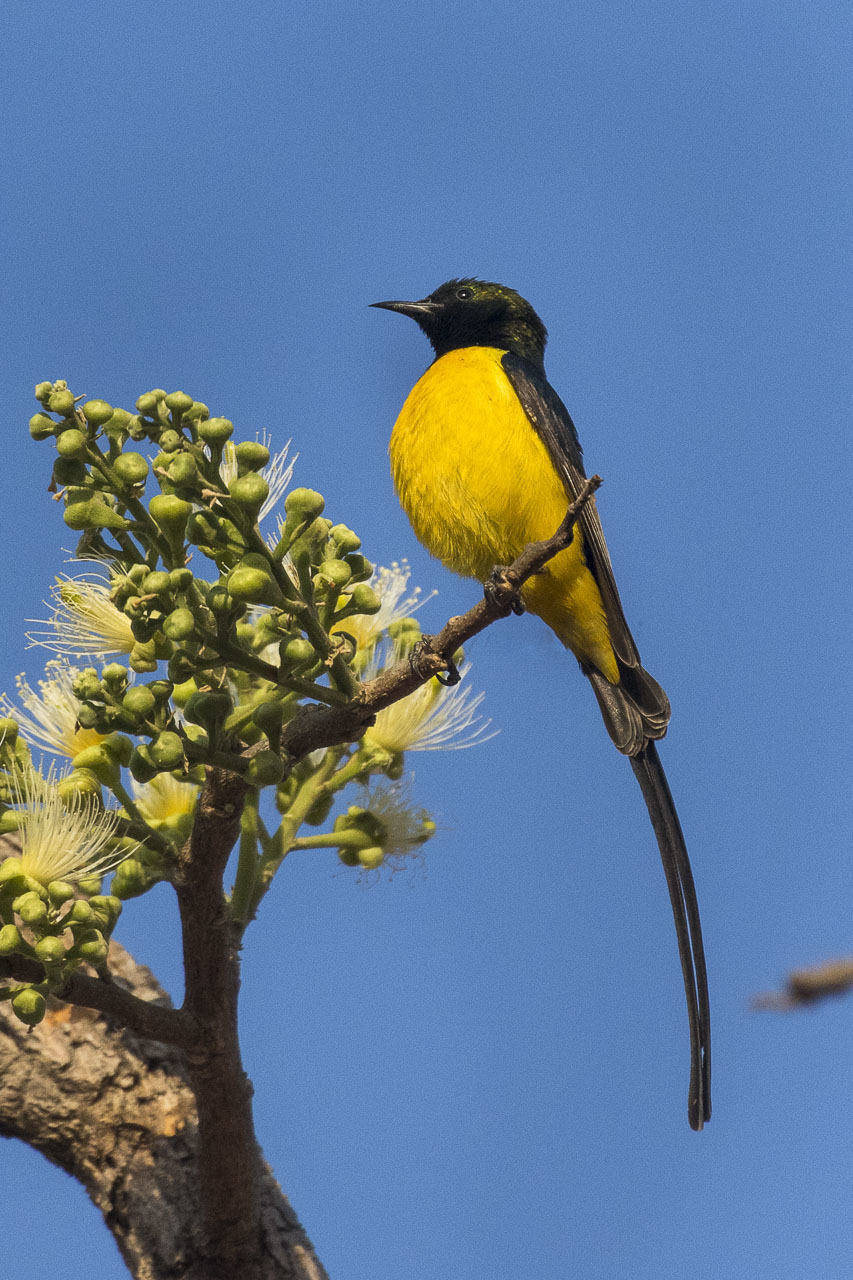

Conservation status
- Least Concern (IUCN 3.1)

Scientific classification
- Kingdom: Animalia
- Phylum: Chordata
- Class: Aves
- Order: Passeriformes
- Family: Nectariniidae
- Genus: Hedydipna
- Species: H. platura

Binomial name
- Hedydipna platura (Vieillot, 1819)

Synonyms
- Anthreptes platurus Anthodiaeta platura

= Pygmy sunbird =

Species of bird

The pygmy sunbird (Hedydipna platura) is a species of bird in the family Nectariniidae. It is found in Benin, Burkina Faso, Cameroon, Central African Republic, Chad, Democratic Republic of the Congo, Ivory Coast, Ethiopia, Gambia, Ghana, Guinea, Guinea-Bissau, Kenya, Mali, Mauritania, Niger, Nigeria, Senegal, Sierra Leone, Sudan, Togo, and Uganda.

== Description ==
Male birds have green back, yellow belly, and an extremely long central tail feather, while females have gray-brown upperparts and dim-yellow underparts.
