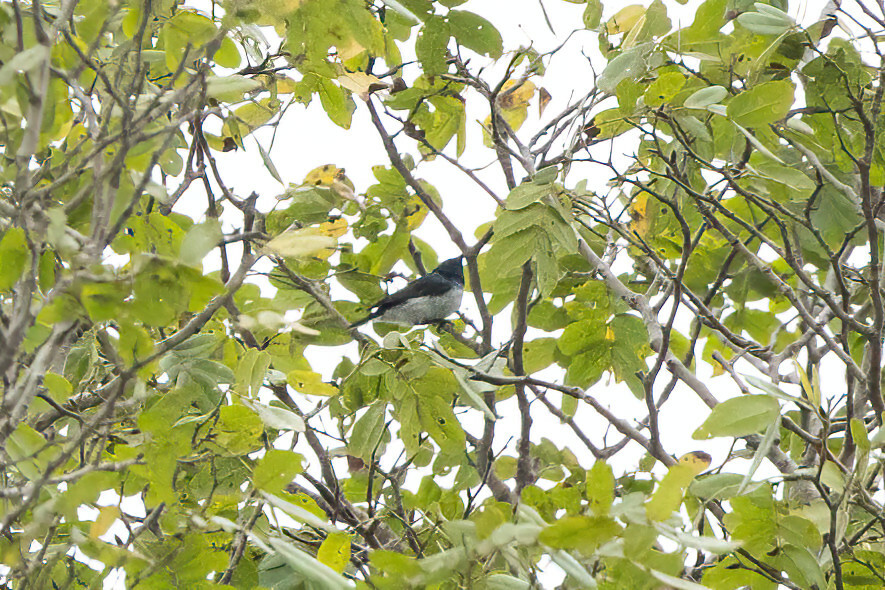

Conservation status
- Endangered (IUCN 3.1)

Scientific classification
- Kingdom: Animalia
- Phylum: Chordata
- Class: Aves
- Order: Passeriformes
- Family: Nectariniidae
- Genus: Hedydipna
- Species: H. pallidigaster

Binomial name
- Hedydipna pallidigaster (Sclater, WL & Moreau, 1935)

Synonyms
- Anthreptes pallidigaster Anthodiaeta pallidigaster

= Amani sunbird =

Species of bird

The Amani sunbird (Hedydipna pallidigaster) is a species of bird in the family Nectariniidae. It is found in Kenya and Tanzania. Its natural habitats are subtropical or tropical moist lowland forests and subtropical or tropical moist montane forests. The male Amani sunbird has a white and dark-green feathered body while the female Amani sunbird has a yellow and grey plumage. Breeding season takes place from May to June and from September to December. The regular diet of the Amani sunbird consists of spiders, caterpillars and other flying insects. It is threatened by habitat loss.

== Description ==
The Amani sunbird is a small vibrant bird with distinctive features. Adult males have a dark green head and throat that transitions into a light green chest and a yellow stomach. The bill is slightly curved at the end, the wings are dark, and the tail is slightly long. Females are not as colorful as males and they are an olive-brown color with a darker gray head and light yellow parts on their bodies. The color of the female birds helps to blend into their surroundings. It measures ten to twelve centimeters in length with a wingspan of fifteen to twenty centimeters. This species tends to travel alone or in pairs but can be seen with other bird flocks such as the Collared sunbird.

== Habitat and Diet ==
The Amani sunbird's natural habitat is limited to specific regions within Tanzania and coastal Kenya. They are found in open woodlands, low density forests, and the Usambara and Udzungwa mountains. The Tanzania forests grow from 200-1,550 meters in elevation. This species prefers dense and tropical forest and thrive off of areas with a variety of plants. Geography plays a role in the bird's diet and behavior. They typically eat small invertebrates, nectar from trees and bushes, spiders, caterpillars, and other insects.

== Vocalization ==
The bird's call is softer and does not make as much noise as other birds. Their call has only been able to be recorded within a close range. Each bird of this species had similar frequencies regardless of which area it was in.

== Migration and breeding ==
In 2006 surveys were run, these surveys found the Amani sunbird in cultivated areas. Even though they were found in a cultivated area, said area was no more than 800 m from the forest where the bird inhabited. This bird's breeding season occurs from May to June and September to December.

== Conservation status ==
As of July 27 2020 the Amani sunbird was declared a threatened species by the IUCN Red list, with only 1,500-7,000 mature individuals alive. Their population is steadily decreasing, while also losing many of their mature individuals as of 2024. The generational lifespan as of 2024 is 2.6 years. The Amani sunbird was declared an endangered species by the IUCN Red List in 2020. The IUCN Redlist states that the Amani sunbird had only 2–5 locations left as of 2020. The Amani sunbird is a species that is expiring.
