= Armando (given name) =

Armando is a masculine given name. It is a variant of the name Herman. Notable people bearing the name include:

- Armando Allen (born 1989), American football player
- Armando Álvarez (disambiguation), multiple people
- Armando Angelini (1891–1968), Italian lawyer and politician
- Armando Bacot (born 2000), American basketball player
- Armando Bandini (1926–2011), Italian actor
- Armando Becker (born 1966), Venezuelan basketball player
- Armando Castagna, Italian speedway rider
- Armando Colombo, German engineer
- Armando Cougnet (1880–1959), Italian journalist
- Armando Diaz (1861–1928), Italian general
- Armando Dobra (born 2001), Albanian footballer
- Armando Estrada (born 1978), ring name for American professional wrestler and manager, Hazem Ali
- Armando Gallop (1970–1996), American acid house musician
- Armando Guevara (born 1955), Venezuelan boxer
- Armando Herrera (triple jumper) (born 1955), Cuban triple jumper
- Armando Iannucci (born 1963), Scottish radio and television presenter and satirist
- Armando Lambruschini (1924–2004), Argentine admiral
- Armando Manzanero (1935–2020), Mexican Mayan musician, singer, composer
- Armando Monteiro (disambiguation), several people
- Armando Osma (1961–2025), Colombian football player and manager
- Armando Palacio Valdés (1853–1938), Spanish writer
- Pitbull (rapper) (born 1981), stage name of Armando Christian Pérez
- Armando Pombeiro (born 1949), Portuguese chemical engineer
- Armando Ribeiro (born 1971), Spanish football goalkeeper
- Armando Riviera (born 1937), Italian politician
- Armando Silvestre (1926–2024), American and Mexican actor
- Armando Stettner, computer engineer

== See also ==
- Armando (disambiguation)
