= Tom Herman (disambiguation) =

Tom Herman (born 1975) is head football coach at Florida Atlantic.

Thomas or Tom Herman may also refer to:

- R. Thomas Herman, columnist for The Wall Street Journal
- Tom Herman (American football coach, Mercyhurst), American football offensive line coach at Mercyhurst University
- Tom Herman, member of Pere Ubu

== See also ==
- Thomas Herman Johnson (1870–1927), Canadian politician
