= Armando J. L. Pombeiro =

Portuguese chemical engineer (born 1949)

Armando José Latourrette de Oliveira Pombeiro is a Portuguese chemical engineer.

He was born in 1949 in Porto, Portugal. His education includes Chemical Engineering (1971, Instituto Superior Técnico (IST), Technical Univ. Lisbon); D.Phil. (1976, University of Sussex, England; supervisors: Prof. J. Chatt and Dr. R.L. Richards). He is currently a Full Professor (IST, since 1989) and Coordinator/Founder of the research Group on “Coordination Chemistry and Molecular Electrochemistry, Synthesis and Catalysis”. Pombeiro is a Full Member of the Academy of Sciences of Lisbon (since 1988), Member of the International Society of Electrochemistry, and was Chairman of the XXV Int. Conf. Organometallic Chemistry (XXV ICOMC, 2012). As a published author, he is widely held in libraries worldwide.

In 2022, he was elected a member of the Academia Europaea.

== Academic work ==
Since 1971, Pombeiro has been working at the Instituto Superior Técnico (IST), Technical Univ. Lisbon in Lisbon. He is currently Full Professor. His research activities concern:

=== Activation of small molecules ===
Activation of small molecules with biological, pharmacological, environmental or industrial interest or related ones [e.g., alkanes (functionalization under mild conditions), alkynes, phosphaalkynes, isocyanides, carbon monoxide, dinitrogen, nitriles, cyanamides, nitric oxide, oximes, oxadiazolines, carboxamides, amidines, olefins, azides or cyanates] by transition metal centres, and developing their application in metal-mediated synthesis and catalysis, namely by searching for mimetic systems of biological processes (e.g. catalysed by peroxidases, particulate methanemonooxygenase, nitrile hydratases and nitrogenases), alternatives for industrial processes and new types of molecular activation with significance in fine chemistry (including the synthesis of compounds with bioactivity). Thus, he developed carboxylation of saturated hydrocarbons with carbon monoxide and persulfate anion catalyzed by various metal compounds (the Sen–Fujiwara–Pombeiro reaction).

=== Crystal engineering of coordination compounds ===
Crystal engineering of coordination compounds, self-assembly of polynuclear and supramolecular structures, transition metal and organometallic chemistries and catalysis in aqueous media, high pressure gas reactions.

=== Molecular electrochemistry of coordination and organic compounds ===
Molecular electrochemistry of coordination and organic compounds, namely towards applications in electrosynthesis, electrocatalysis and in mechanistic studies, as well as in the establishment of potential-structure relationships, and in the induction of chemical reactivity by electron-transfer.

=== Publications ===
A. J. L. Pombeiro has published about 500 papers in chemical journals. He is the editor and author (coauthor) of monographs and chapters. Pombeiro is a Member of the Editorial Advisory Board of the ACS Catalysis (2011, the year of foundation), Inorganic Chemistry Communications (since 2003), Trends in Inorganic Chemistry (since 2008), Letters in Organic Chemistry (2008–10) and Portugaliae Electrochimiac Acta (since 1998) of the Journal of the Chinese Institute of Engineers (since 2011) and Catalysts (since 2010). His selected prizes: Madinabeitia (International Hispano-Portuguese prize), Royal Spanish Chemical Society, 2013, J. Heyrovský Centennial Medal ("J. Heyrovský Centennial Congress on Polarography", Prague, 1990), Rotary Club (Oporto) scholar prize, 1965–66.
