= Armağan Dam =

Coordinates: 41.8835°N 27.4362°E

- Interactive map of Armağan Dam
- Official name: Armağan Barajı
- Location: Turkey
- Status: Operational
- Construction began: 1986
- Opening date: 1998

Dam and spillways
- Type of dam: Earth fill dam
- Dam volume: 1 553 000 m³

Armağan Dam is a dam in Kırklareli Province, Turkey, built between 1986 and 1998. It is a rockfill dam.

== See also ==
- List of dams and reservoirs in Turkey
