= 2023 Paris attack =

Terrorist attack in Paris, France

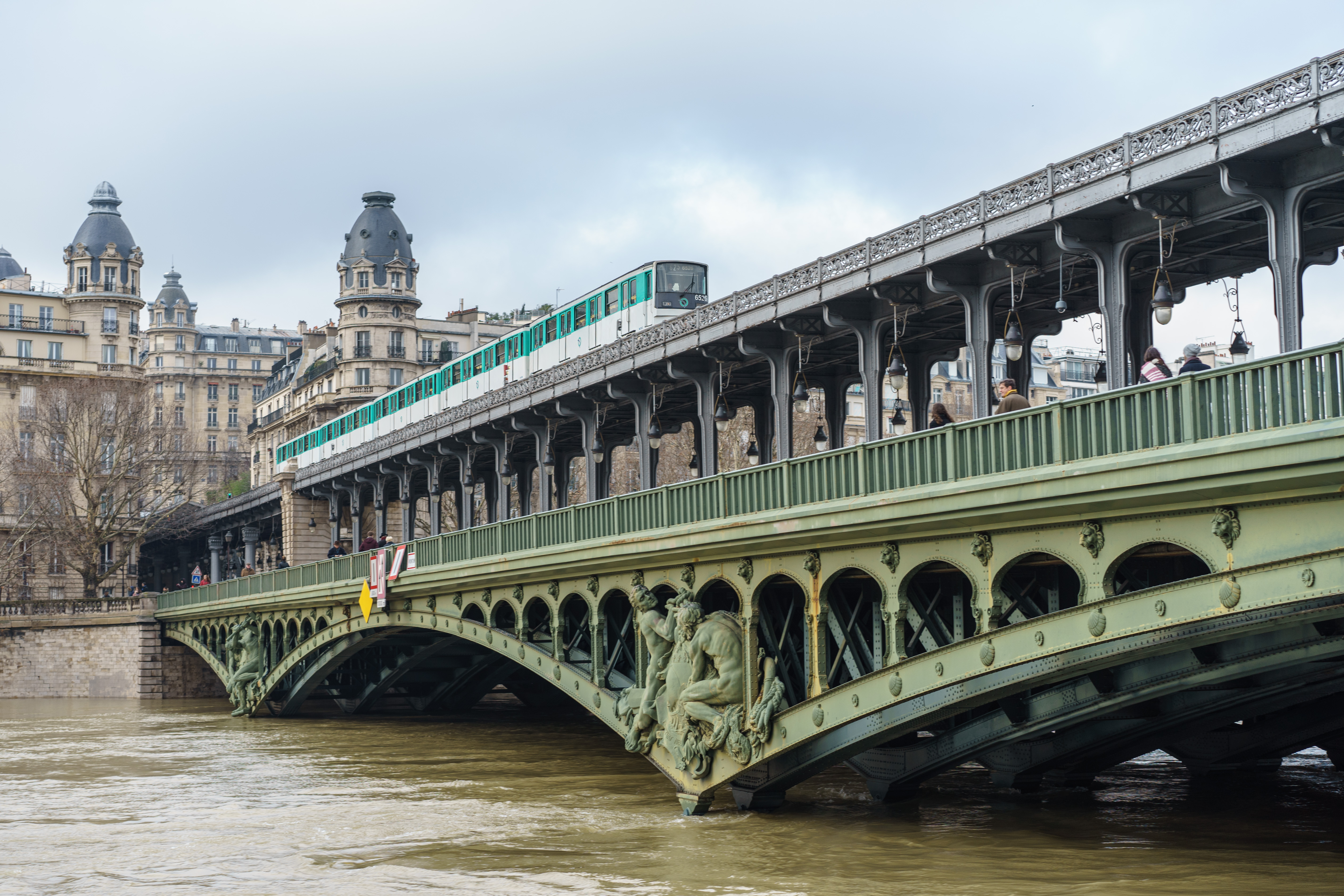
- The Pont de Bir-Hakeim in 2018
- Location: Near the Pont de Bir-Hakeim in Paris, France
- Date: 2 December 2023; 2 years ago Just before 21:00 (CET (UTC+01:00))
- Weapons: machete and hammer
- Deaths: 1
- Injuries: 2
- Motive: Islamic extremism
- Accused: Armand Rajabpour-Miyandoabis

On 2 December 2023, a French man carried out a machete and hammer attack against three people near the Pont de Bir-Hakeim in Paris, France, killing one of them. The suspect was allegedly motivated by Islamic extremism.

== Attack ==
On Quai de Grenelle in the 15th arrondissement of Paris, just before 21:00 CET (20:00 GMT) on 2 December 2023, a man attacked three people using a knife and hammer as he allegedly shouted "Allahu Akbar". One victim was killed.

Police tasered the suspect near the scene and arrested him for premeditated murder and terrorist-motivated attempted murder.

== Victims ==
The fatally attacked victim was a young man who was a tourist from the Philippines, who had immigrated to Germany. He was a nurse who was a naturalised German citizen. The surviving victims are a Frenchman aged around 60 and a 66-year-old British tourist.

== Suspect ==
The suspect is Armand Rajabpour-Miyandoabis, a 26-year-old man who has mental health problems. He was born in France in 1997 to Iranian parents who fled the Iranian Revolution in 1979. He acquired French nationality on 20 March 2002, through the collective effort of his parents' naturalization. His birth first name was Iman, but it was changed in 2003. He was released from prison in 2020 after serving four years for planning an attack. Prosecutor Jean-François Ricard said the suspect had pledged allegiance to the Islamic State.

== Reactions ==
President Emmanuel Macron described it as a terrorist attack.

Prime Minister Elisabeth Borne wrote on X, "We will not give in to terrorism".
