= Armaan Zorace =

Indian film director, producer and screenwriter (born 1983)

- Born: Armaan Zorace; 1993 (age 32–33); Dubai
- Occupations: Film director; film producer; screenwriter
- Years active: 2011–present

Armaan Zorace (born 1993) is a Hollywood film director, producer and screenwriter.

== Career ==
Inspired by the works of Stanley Kubrick and Steven Spielberg, Zorace made his debut in 2011 with the short film God Is Dead, which was nominated for an award at the Cannes Film Festival in 2011.

In 2019 he began directing the horror film Wraith. The film is set to feature a live Islamic exorcism according to horror website Bloody Disgusting. As of 2019, he is also working on a superhero movie Gamma Man .

He is currently producing a film with Matt Reeves titled Switchboard.

== Filmography ==
Year	Title	Notes
2011	God Is Dead	Short film; director, writer
2012	The Lucky 100 Dollar Bill	Short film; director, producer
2020	The Aryan Papers	Director
TBA	Wraith	Writer
TBA	Gamma Man	Writer
TBA	Honeymoon in Taliban	Director
