= Armond Fields =

- Born: November 22, 1930; Chicago, Illinois, US
- Died: August 17, 2008 (aged 77); Culver City, California, US

Armond Fields was an American market research consultant, a painter, a graphic artist, and a prolific social historian who wrote art and theater biographies.

== Early life and education ==
Fields was born in Chicago, Illinois, to Louis Max and Esther Fields. His primary education he received in schools in the Mid-West. He received his B.S. from the University of Wisconsin (1953), M.A. from the University of Illinois (1955) and Ph.D. from the University of Chicago (1956).

== Work ==
Fields was active in several fields. As a writer he wrote several biographies, primarily on vaudeville performers. His oil paintings, drawings and prints were a part of exhibitions in the United States and Europe. He curated, wrote catalogues, and donated art for various exhibitions (most recently: Paris, Turn-of-the-Century, Santa Barbara Museum of Art, 2003; Vaudeville is Dead! Long Live Vaudeville!, Doheny Library, University of Southern California, 2005). Fields also served as a consultant in the areas of market strategy and consumer behavior. Among his clients were Interpublic Co. (marketing and research vice president, 1960–69), for Audio-Video Entertainment, Inc. (corporate officer, 2000-?) and AltaVoice Communications (consumer behavior consultant, 2001?).

== Bibliography ==
- Henri Rivière (1983) ISBN 0879051337
- George Auriol (1985) ISBN 0879052007
- From the Bowery to Broadway: Lew Fields and the Roots of American Popular Theatre (1993) ISBN 0195053818
- Le Chat Noir: A Montmartre Cabaret and Its Artists in Turn-Of-The Century Paris (1994) ISBN 0899510876
- Eddie Foy: A Biography of the Early Popular Stage Comedian (1999) ISBN 0786443286
- James J. Corbett: A Biography of the Heavyweight Boxing Champion and Popular Theater Headliner (2001) ISBN 0786409096
- Fred Stone: Circus Performer and Musical Comedy Star (2002) ISBN 0786411619
- Katharine Dexter McCormick: Pioneer for Women's Rights (2003) ISBN 0275980049
- Sophie Tucker: First Lady of Show Business (2003) ISBN 0786415770
- Maude Adams: Idol of American Theater, 1872-1953 (2004) ISBN 078641927X
- Women Vaudeville Stars: Eighty Biographical Profiles (2006) ISBN 0786425830
- Tony Pastor, Father of Vaudeville (2007) ISBN 0786430540
- Lillian Russell: A Biography of "America's Beauty" (2008) ISBN 0786405090
