= Jack Armand =

English footballer

Personal information
- Full name: John Edward Armand
- Date of birth: 11 August 1898
- Place of birth: Sabathu, British India
- Date of death: 1974 (aged 75–76)
- Position: Inside forward

Senior career*
Years	Team	Apps	(Gls)
1921–1922	West Stanley		
1922–1929	Leeds United	74	(23)
1929–1931	Swansea Town	54	(10)
1931–1932	Ashton National		
1932	Southport	0	(0)
1933	Newport County	3	(1)
1934	Scarborough		
1934	Denaby United		
Total		131	(34)
- * Club domestic league appearances and goals

John Edward Armand (11 August 1898 – 1974) was an English footballer who played in the Football League for Leeds United, Newport County and Swansea Town. Born in Sabathu, British India, Armand became the first oversees player for both Leeds and Swansea.
