= Herman Long =

Herman Long may refer to:

- Herman Long (baseball) (1866–1909), American baseball shortstop
- Herman H. Long (1912–1976), American academic, administrator and author of race relations studies

== See also ==
- Long (Western surname)
