= Armand de Pontmartin =

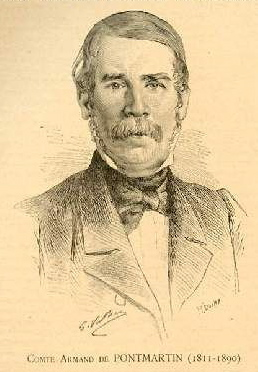
Armand de Pontmartin

Armand Augustin Joseph Marie Ferrard, Comte de Pontmartin (1811-1890) was a French journalist, critic and man of letters.

Pontmartin was born at Avignon (Vaucluse), France, on 16 July 1811. A Legitimist sympathizer, he began his career by attacking the Encyclopédistes and their successors. In the Assemblée nationale he published his Causeries litteraires, a series of attacks on prominent Liberals, which created some sensation.

Pontmartin was an indefatigable journalist, and most of his papers were eventually published in volume form: Contes et reveries d'un planteur de choux (1845); Causeries du samedi (1857-1860); Nouveaux samedis (1865-1881), &c. But the most famous of all his books is Les Jeudis de Mme. Charbonneau (1862), which under the form of a novel offered a series of malicious and witty portraits of contemporary writers.

Pontmartin died at Avignon on 29 March 1890.
