= Cila Herman =

Yugoslav-American thermal engineer

Cila V. Herman is an American thermal engineer from the former Yugoslavia. Her research has concerned heat transfer, the use of thermal imaging to diagnose skin cancer, refrigeration using thermoacoustic heat engines, and the electromagnetic control of bubbles in boiling liquids. She is retired as a professor emerita at the Johns Hopkins University Department of Mechanical Engineering, where she formerly directed the Heat Transfer Lab.

Despite hoping to become a physician like her mother, Herman was pushed by her family to become an electrical engineering student at the University of Novi Sad in Yugoslavia. She completed a doctorate in mechanical engineering in 1992 at the Technical University of Munich in Germany, and in the same year joined the Johns Hopkins University faculty. After receiving a National Science Foundation CAREER Award, Herman was a 1997 recipient of the Presidential Early Career Award for Scientists and Engineers. She retired as a professor emerita in 2017.
