= Armando Álvarez =

Armando Álvarez may refer to:

- Armando Alvarez (baseball) (born 1994), American baseball player
- Armando Álvarez (footballer) (born 1970), Spanish footballer
- Armando Álvarez Marín (fl. 1980s), Chilean public official
