= Armağan Kuş =

Turkish footballer (born 1992)

Personal information
- Date of birth: 1 January 1992 (age 34)
- Place of birth: Samsun, Turkey
- Height: 1.75 m (5 ft 9 in)
- Position: Winger

Youth career
- 2003–2006: Samsunspor

Senior career*
Years	Team	Apps	(Gls)
2006–2008	Samsunspor	0	(0)
2008–2011	Kayserispor	1	(0)
2011–2013	Samsunspor	0	(0)
2011–2012	→ Çarşambaspor (loan)	19	(1)
2012	→ Belediye Bingölspor (loan)	2	(0)
2013–2014	Bayrampaşa	8	(0)
2014–2015	Gaziosmanpaşa	9	(0)
2015–2016	Yalovaspor	12	(1)
2016–2017	Serhat Ardahanspor	33	(7)
2017–2018	Ceyhanspor	8	(1)
2018	Yalova Kadiköy	5	(0)

International career
2007	Turkey U15	3	(0)
2006–2008	Turkey U16	23	(1)
2009	Turkey U18	2	(0)
- * Club domestic league appearances and goals

Armağan Kuş (born 1 January 1992) is a Turkish former professional footballer who played as a winger. He is also a former youth international, earning caps at the U-16 and U-18 levels.
