= Armando Monteiro =

Armando Monteiro may refer to:

- Armando Monteiro (politician) (born 1952), Brazilian politician and lawyer
- Armando Monteiro (footballer), Brazilian footballer and musician
- Armando Monteiro Filho (1925–2018), Brazilian businessman, engineer, and politician
- Armindo Monteiro (1896–1955), Portuguese professor, businessman, diplomat, and politician
