= Amani Lewis =

American artist

Amani Lewis (born 1994) is an American artist based in Baltimore, Maryland, who uses they/them pronouns.

== Early life and education ==
Lewis grew up in Columbia, Maryland. They earned a BFA from Maryland Institute College of Arts in 2016.

== Art career ==
In September, 2019, Lewis showed Amani Lewis: Subjective Nature at the August Wilson African American Cultural Center in Pittsburgh, PA. They are interested in social justice and community activism. In 2019, Lewis showed a group show titled: Conjuring Wholeness at De Buck Gallery in New York City.

Lewis was an Artist-in-Residence at Fountainhead Residency and Studios in Miami, and their work is included in the collection of the Pérez Art Museum in Miami and The Broad in Los Angeles. In 2020, they were in a group show titled: Black Voices/Black Microcosm at CFHILL Art Space in Stockholm, Sweden curated by Destinee Ross. Their solo show CHAPTER 1, The Mind in Chaos Meets the God of Clarity, ran at Mindy Solomon Gallery in Miami, Florida from October 19-November 23, 2024.
