= Dan Armon =

Israeli poet (born 1948)

Dan Armon (Hebrew: דן ערמון) is an Israeli poet born in Jerusalem in 1948. He studied literature and theater at the Hebrew University of Jerusalem and has published four books of poems.
