= Armand Doré =

French painter

- Born: 1824
- Died: 1882 (aged 57–58)
- Occupation: Painter

Armand Doré (1824–1882) was a French painter. In later years, Doré became an alcoholic, and he died in poverty.

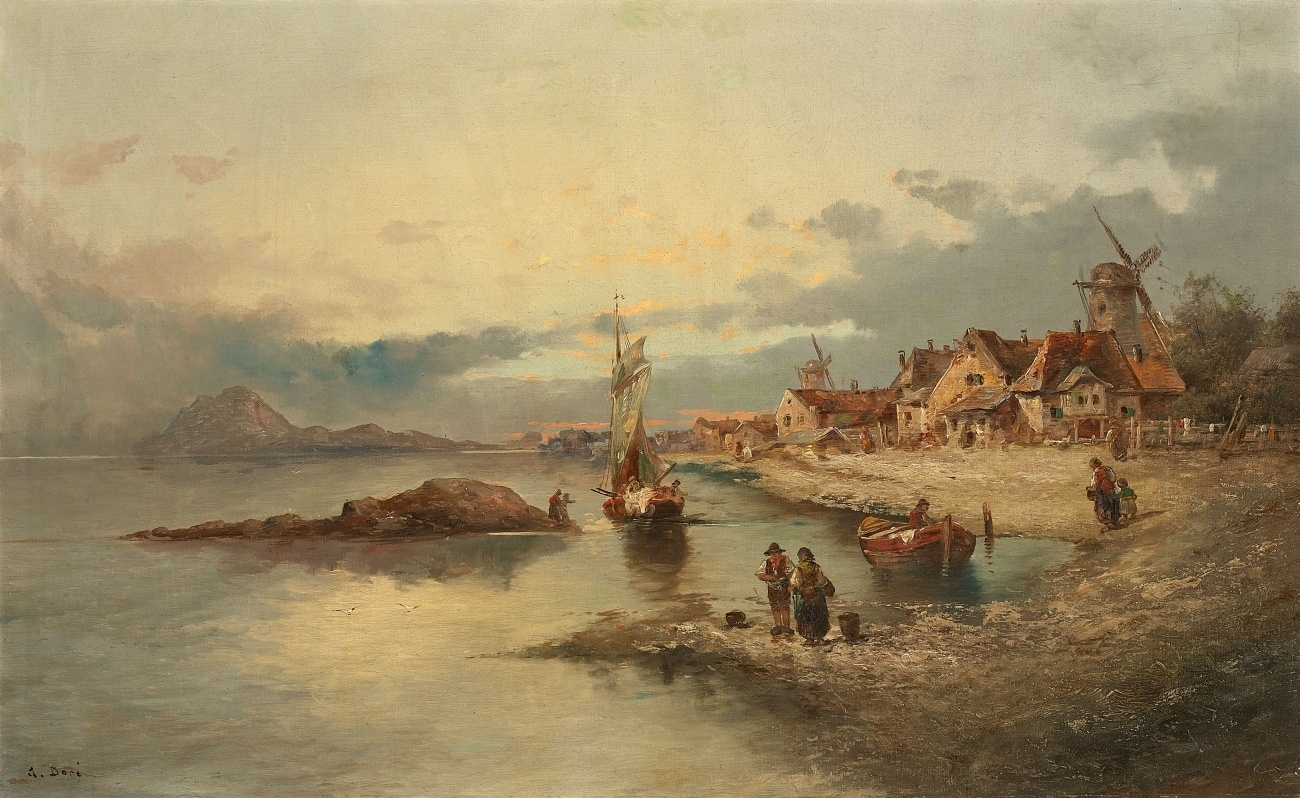
1882 painting by Armand Doré.
