= Arman Mehaković =

Bosnia and Herzegovina footballer

Personal information
- Date of birth: 9 March 1988 (age 38)
- Place of birth: Bosnia and Herzegovina
- Height: 1.78 m (5 ft 10 in)
- Position: Forward

Team information
- Current team: Svebølle B&I
- Number: 99

Youth career
- Køge BK

Senior career*
Years	Team	Apps	(Gls)
2008–2009	Køge BK	12	(1)
2009	Herfølge	3	(0)
2009–2011	HB Køge	36	(3)
2011	Næstved	14	(1)
2012–	Svebølle		
- * Club domestic league appearances and goals as of 7 February 2007

Arman Mehaković (born 9 March 1988) is a Bosnian-Herzegovinian footballer who plays as a forward for Danish side Svebølle B&I. He previously represented Køge BK, Herfølge and Næstved BK.

== Career ==
Following Køge BK's bankruptcy and the release of its players, Mehaković trialled with Herfølge in February 2009. He signed a one-year contract with Herfølge the same month.

In November 2009, joined HB Køge on a 2.5-year full-time contract.

He made 14 appearances scoring once for Næstved in the 2011 autumn season.

Mehaković was on trial at Danish 2nd Division club Svebølle in February 2012.
