= Gesner Armand =

Haitian painter

Gesner Armand (11 June 1936 – 10 June 2008) was a Haitian painter.

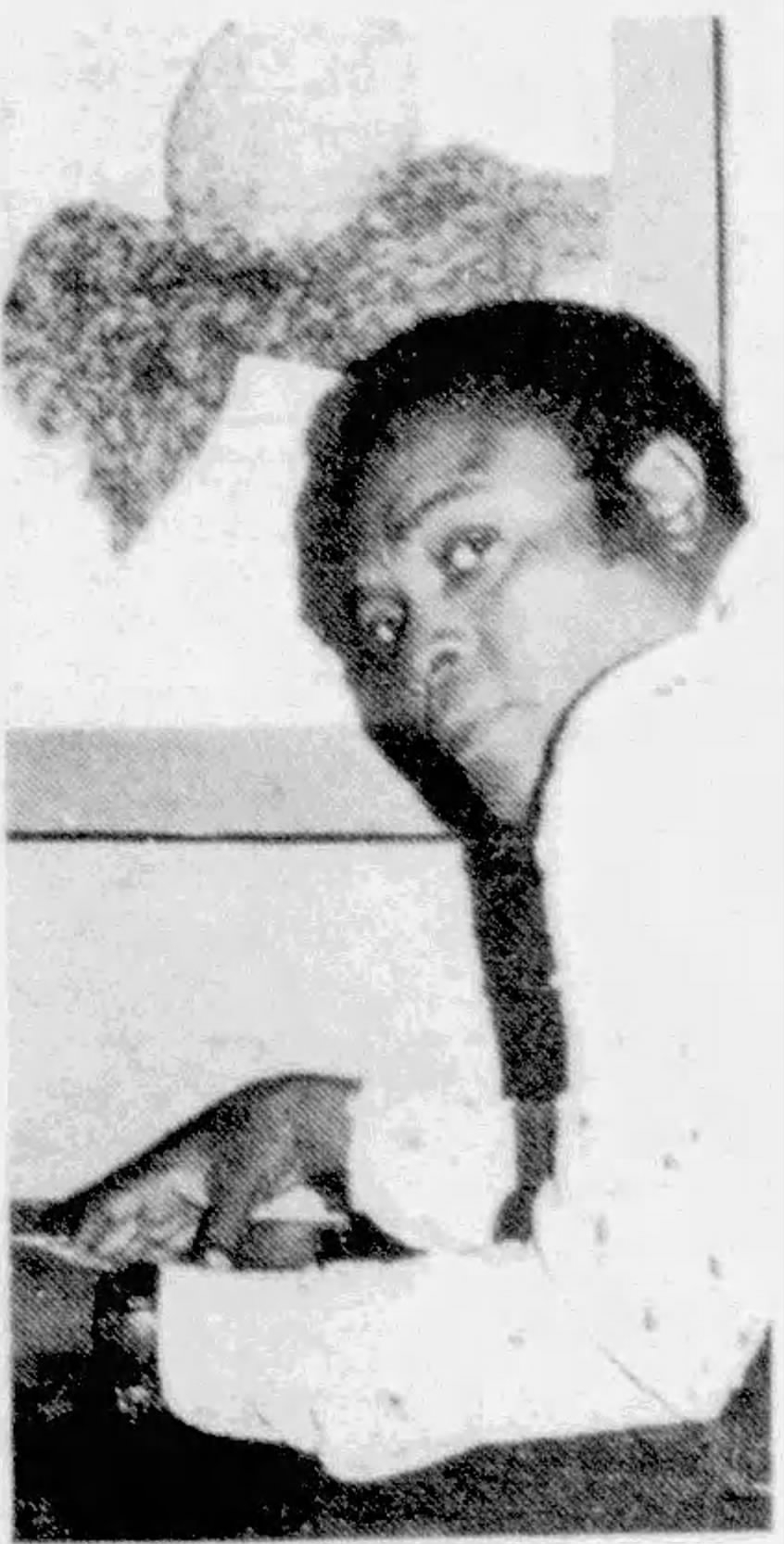
Armand in 1977

Born in Croix-des-Bouquets, Armand studied in both Haiti and France and was a member of the Centre d'Art. He was the Director of the Museum of Haitian Art at St. Pierre's College. His paintings, which typically depict peasant life, carnivals, or pigeons, have been exhibited in Mexico, the United States, France, Spain, Jamaica, Martinique, Venezuela, Barbados, the Dominican Republic, Guadeloupe, and Israel.
