= Louis Armand =

French engineer, Resistance officer and senior civil servant (1905–1971)

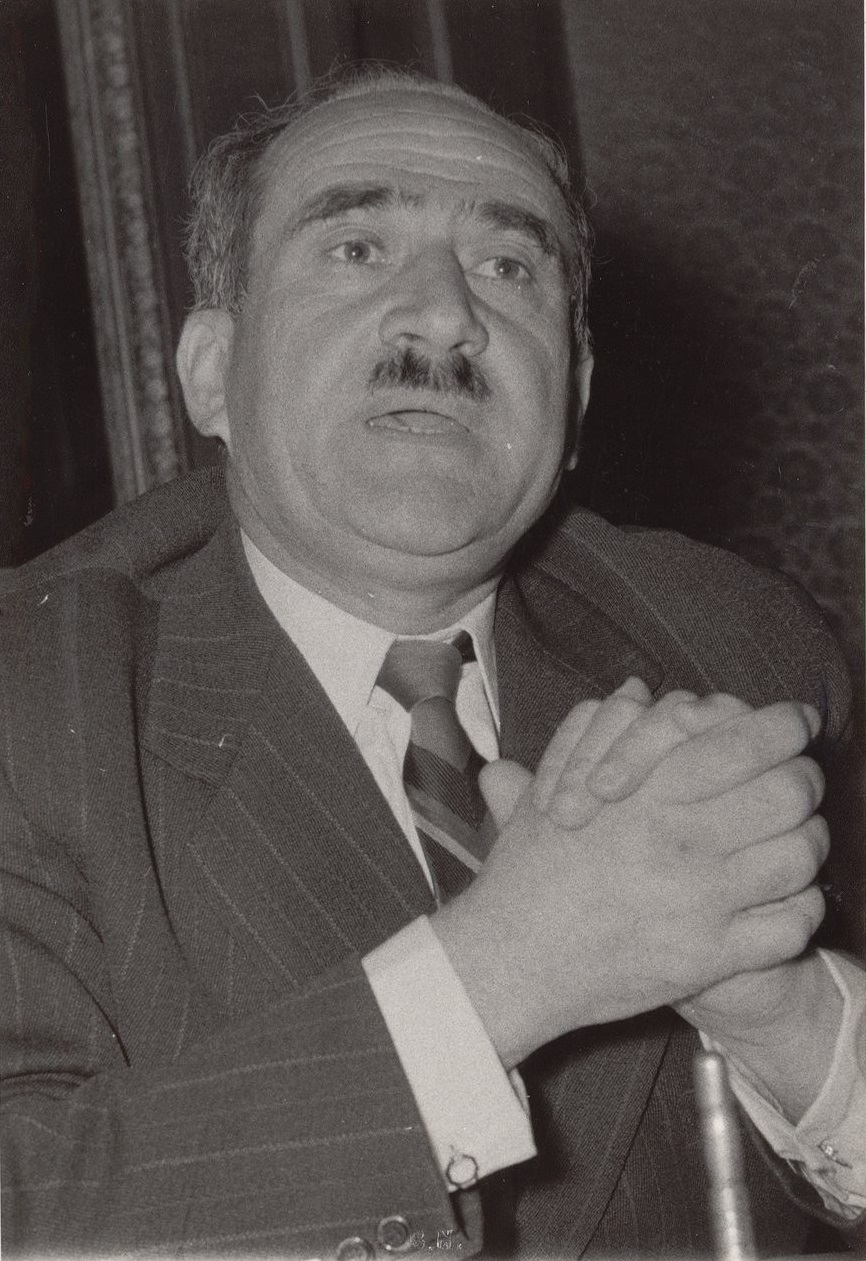
- Born: Louis François Armand; 17 January 1905; Cruseilles, France
- Died: 30 August 1971 (aged 66); Villers-sur-Mer, France
- Education: Lycée du Parc; École Polytechnique; École Nationale Supérieure des Mines de Paris
- Occupation: Engineer
- Known for: Inventor, administrator, resistance fighter
- Spouse: Geneviève Gazel (m. 1928–1971)
- Relatives: Antoine Armand (great-grandson)

Louis François Armand (French: [lwi aʁmɑ̃]; 17 January 1905 – 30 August 1971) was a French engineer and senior civil servant who managed several public companies and had a significant role in World War II. He was an officer in the Resistance who was arrested by the Gestapo and then freed from jail during the liberation of Paris.

He served as the first president of the European Atomic Energy Community (Euratom) from 1958 to 1959 before he was elected to the Académie Française in 1963.

A station on Marseille Metro Line 1 opened in 2010 under Boulevard Louis-Armand bears his name.

== Biography ==
=== Early years ===
Louis Armand was born in Cruseilles, Haute-Savoie, and studied in Annecy and in Lyon at the Lycée du Parc. He graduated second in his class from the École Polytechnique (class of 1924), then joined the Corps des Mines and was major from École des Mines. He married his wife, Genevieve Gazel, in 1928.

=== Career ===
He joined the Compagnie du chemin de fer Paris à Lyon et à la Méditerranée (PLM) in 1934, transferring to the Société Nationale des Chemins de fer Français (SNCF) when the PLM was nationalised in 1938. In 1940–1941 he invented a method for preventing the calcification, furring up, of engine boilers called the Traitement Integral Armand (TIA) water treatment process for steam locomotives.

During the Second World War he organized and led the resistance group named Résistance-Fer from February 1943 onwards. He was arrested by the Gestapo on 25 June 1944. He was liberated from jail during the liberation of Paris, and was decorated with the Croix de la Liberation.

In 1949, Armand was named the general manager of the SNCF and created the Société du tunnel sous la Manche in 1957. During this time, he pushed for the electrification of the rail system using AC voltage.

He chaired the Armand Commission, which was part of the European Atomic Energy Community (Euratom). He became the head of Euratom in 1958.

In the late 1960s, Armand was instrumental in helping Christian LeClercq and the Junior Chamber of Commerce of Brussels to start a new European think-tank and membership organization: "L'Entreprise de Demain - Forum for Tomorrow."

This non-profit and non-political organization was soon going to leave the Junior Chamber of Commerce to become independent. To help that organization, Louis Armand provided access to "global leaders" in international business, world politics, academia and scientific research who addressed the Forum, under the royal guidance of Baudouin I of Belgium.

"L'Entreprise de Demain - Forum for Tomorrow" soon developed chapters in Denmark, France, Switzerland, and the United States, allowing members to address corporate executives and share their views about the future of the world.

Louis Armand wrote a book on "l'Entreprise de Demain" in 1970, and the history of the organization was also published in the "Que Sais-Je?" collection.

In 1971, Louis Armand successfully pushed to have the word "creativity" included in the French dictionary.

Armand died in Villers-sur-Mer, at 66.

Without the visionary inspiration and guidance of Louis Armand, "L'Entreprise de Demain - Forum for Tomorrow" could never have been formed. The worldwide organization lasted for well over 20 years. Its founder and international president, Christian LeClercq, died in July 2011.

== Bibliography ==
- 1961: Plaidoyer pour l’avenir
- 1965: De la Savoie au Val d’Aoste par le tunnel du Mont-Blanc
- 1968: Simples propos
- 1968: Le pari européen (with Michel Drancourt)
- 1969: Propos ferroviaires
- 1970: De la cybernétique à l’intéressement
- 1970: L’Entreprise de demain
- 1974: Message pour ma patrie professionnelle
