= Edward Herman =

Edward Herman may refer to:

- Edward S. Herman (1925–2017), American economist and media analyst
- Ed Herman (born 1980), American mixed martial arts fighter

== See also ==
- Edward Hermon (1822-1881), English businessman and MP for Preston in Lancashire
- Edward John Herrmann (1913–1999), American Catholic bishop of Columbus
- Edward Herrmann (1943–2014), American television and film actor
- Ed Herrmann (1946–2013), American baseball player
