= Arman oil field =

Oil Field

Coordinates: 45.3760°N 51.9212°E

Arman Oil Field
- Country: Kazakhstan
- Region: Mangystau Province
- Offshore/onshore: onshore
- Operator: Royal Dutch Shell - 50%, Lukoil - 50%

Field history
- Discovery: 1994
- Start of development: 1994
- Start of production: 1994

Production
- Current production of oil: 3,800 barrels per day (~1.9×10^{5} t/a)
- Estimated oil in place: 11.5 million tonnes (~ 13×10^{6} m^{3} or 84 million bbl)

The Arman Oil Field is an oil field located in Mangystau Province. It was discovered in 1994 and developed by Lukoil. The oil field is operated and owned by Lukoil and Royal Dutch Shell. The total proven reserves of the Arman oil field are around 84 million barrels (11.58 million tonnes), and production is centered on 3,800 barrels per day (600 m^{3}/d).
