= Armands Celitāns =

Latvian volleyball player (born 1984)

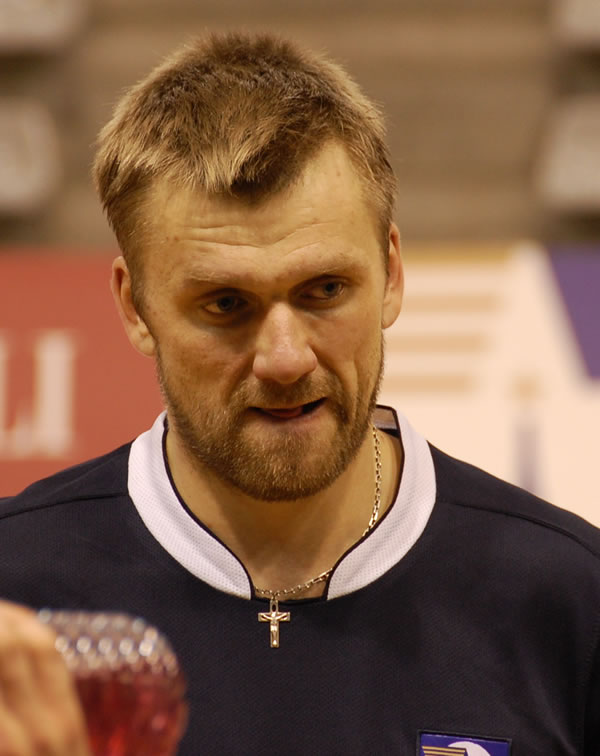
- Celitāns in 2011

Personal information
- Full name: Armands Celitāns
- Nationality: Latvia
- Born: May 28, 1984 (age 42); Krāslava
- Height: 2.00 m (6 ft 7 in)
- Weight: 105 kg (231 lb)
- Spike: 355 cm (140 in)
- Block: 335 cm (132 in)

Volleyball information
- Position: Middle Blocker
- Current club: Paris Volley
- Number: 8

National team
2006-	Latvia
Honours
Men's volleyball
Representing Latvia
- Last updated: November 2013

Armands Celitāns (Kraslava, May 28, 1984) is a Latvian volleyball player who plays on the Latvia men's national volleyball team. His brother, Gundars Celitāns, is also a volleyball player.

== Clubs ==
- (Latvia) Lase-R Riga (2008-2010)
- (Belgium) Knack Roeselare (2010-2011)
- (France) Paris Volley 2011-2013
