= Armando Colombo =

German electrical engineer

Armando Colombo is an electrical engineer with the Schneider Electric Automation GmbH in Bavaria, Germany.

Colombo was named a Fellow of the Institute of Electrical and Electronics Engineers (IEEE) in 2016 for his contributions to industrial cyber-physical systems.
