= Armando (footballer) =

Portuguese footballer

Personal information
- Full name: Armando Ferreira Gomes
- Date of birth: 9 December 1970 (age 55)
- Place of birth: Paços de Ferreira, Portugal
- Height: 1.69 m (5 ft 7 in)
- Position: Defender

Youth career
- 1981–1989: Paços de Ferreira

Senior career*
Years	Team	Apps	(Gls)
1989–1992	Paços de Ferreira		
1990–1991	→ Castêlo da Maia (loan)		
1992–2000	Leça		
2000–2001	Leixões		
- * Club domestic league appearances and goals

Armando Ferreira Gomes (born 9 December 1970) is a retired Portuguese football defender.
