= Armani Jan =

Armani Jan ارمني جان
- Village
- Location within Iran
- Coordinates: 34°36′35″N 47°21′09″E
- Country: Iran
- Province: Kermanshah
- County: Sahneh
- Bakhsh: Dinavar
- Rural District: Dinavar

Population (2006)
  - Total: 713
- Time zone: UTC+3:30 (IRST)
  - Summer (DST): UTC+4:30 (IRDT)

Armani Jan (Persian: ارمني جان, also Romanized as Armanī Jān) is a village in Dinavar Rural District, Dinavar District, Sahneh County, Kermanshah Province, Iran. At the 2006 census, its population was 713, in 171 families.
