= Armond Seidler =

American educator and inventor (1919–2017)

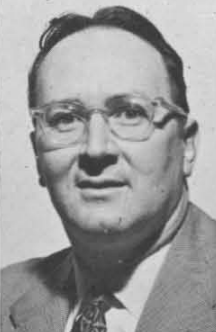
- Seidler in 1964
- Born: December 27, 1919; Chicago, Illinois, US
- Died: April 23, 2017 (aged 97); Albuquerque, New Mexico, US
- Education: University of Illinois Urbana-Champaign
- Occupations: Educator; Inventor

Armond Harold Seidler (December 27, 1919 – April 23, 2017) was an American educator and inventor who spent much of his career at the University of New Mexico, working in the health, fitness, and physical education fields. While a professor at the University of Illinois, he invented the pugil stick, which has since found widespread use in military recruit training. In 33 years as a faculty member at the University of New Mexico, Seidler oversaw the construction of a gym and natatorium, as well as the addition of multiple degrees related to the fields of health and fitness.

== Biography ==
=== Early life and invention of the pugil stick ===
According to his 1941 draft registration card, Armond Harold Seidler was born on December 27, 1919. He grew up in Chicago, and later joined the Army, serving in World War II. After the war, he coached football and basketball at the high school level in Iowa and Illinois. He later became a professor at the University of Illinois, where he had received his PhD. In 1954, while still a professor at Illinois, he collaborated with the Marine Corps to introduce training involving faster bayonet movement. The following year, he developed the pugil stick system of close-quarters combat, using metal poles that were padded at the ends. Inspired by boxing movements, his pugil sticks were intended to replace the outdated training that recruits of the Marine Corps had been receiving previously, allowing them to strike each other with more force with a lower risk of injury. Pugil sticks were part of Marine Corps recruit training by 1956; their use has become far more widespread since then. They are now used during Army basic training, as well as by service members outside of basic training. They were also adopted for the "Joust" challenge featured in American Gladiators and Duel in Gladiators in the UK.

=== University of New Mexico ===
Seidler left Illinois and moved to New Mexico in 1955, becoming the chairman of New Mexico Highlands University's Physical Education Department. In 1957, he became chairman of the University of New Mexico's Health, Physical Education & Recreation Department. His main accomplishment during this fourteen-year tenure was the construction of the university's first natatorium, completed in 1971 and later named after him. He was recognized for his skill in sports facility design.

After his time as chairman, Seidler briefly stepped away from the University of New Mexico, before returning as the director of athletic facilities. In addition to inventing the pugil stick while at the University of Illinois, he was also involved in martial arts at New Mexico, teaching the Seidler System of Personal Defense to students of the university and publishing a self-defense book. He taught for a total of 33 years at the university. Before his retirement in 1990, he oversaw the addition of two physical education-related degrees and the construction of the Johnson Gym; he was also elected a fellow of the American College of Sports Medicine. After his retirement, he continued to attend New Mexico Lobos sporting events. A graduate fellowship in his name was created for students pursuing degrees in health and fitness-related majors shortly before his death in 2017.

=== Personal life and death ===
Seidler died on April 23, 2017, at the age of 97. He was married to Helen Bert, who he met at the University of Illinois. Helen died in 2001. He had three children: sons Todd and Kim, who were both faculty members at the University of New Mexico, and daughter Toni, who studied at the university. Seidler enjoyed listening to opera music, reading, and sailing on his sailboat, which he christened "Army's Navy".
