= Robert Herman (disambiguation) =

Robert Herman (1914–1997) was an American astronomer.

Robert or Bob Herman or Hermann may also refer to:

- Robert Hermann (composer) (1869–1912), Swiss composer
- Robert Hermann (mathematician) (1931–2020), American mathematician and mathematical physicist
- Robert Alfred Herman (1861–1927), mathematics coach in Cambridge
- Robert Dixon Herman (1911–1990), U.S. federal judge
- Robert H. Herman (1925–1980), American gastroenterologist
- Robert J. Hermann (1933–2023), NRO director
- Robert Joseph Hermann (born 1934), Catholic bishop
- Bob Herman (cricketer) (Robert Stephen Herman, born 1946), English cricketer
- Bob Herman (sociologist) (Robert Dunton Herman, 1928–2021), American sociologist
- Bob Hermann (1923–2020), American businessman and soccer executive
- Glob Herman (Robert Herman), a Marvel Comics mutant character
