= Arman Sadeghi =

American entrepreneur (born 1977)

Arman Sadeghi (born June 26, 1977) is an American entrepreneur. He is known for being a professional speaker and the founder of All Green Electronics Recycling. He spoke at TedxNewportCoast in 2012 on the topic the negative health impact of electronic recycling.

== Career ==
Sadeghi began his career by dropping out of high school at the age of 15. Throughout his career, Arman worked with different companies and founded several of them related to various fields. Notable among them include;

=== All Green Electronics Recycling ===
All Green Electronics Recycling is a full service provider of Electronics Recycling, IT Asset management and Data Destruction Services headquartered in Tustin, California. He founded it in 2008.
