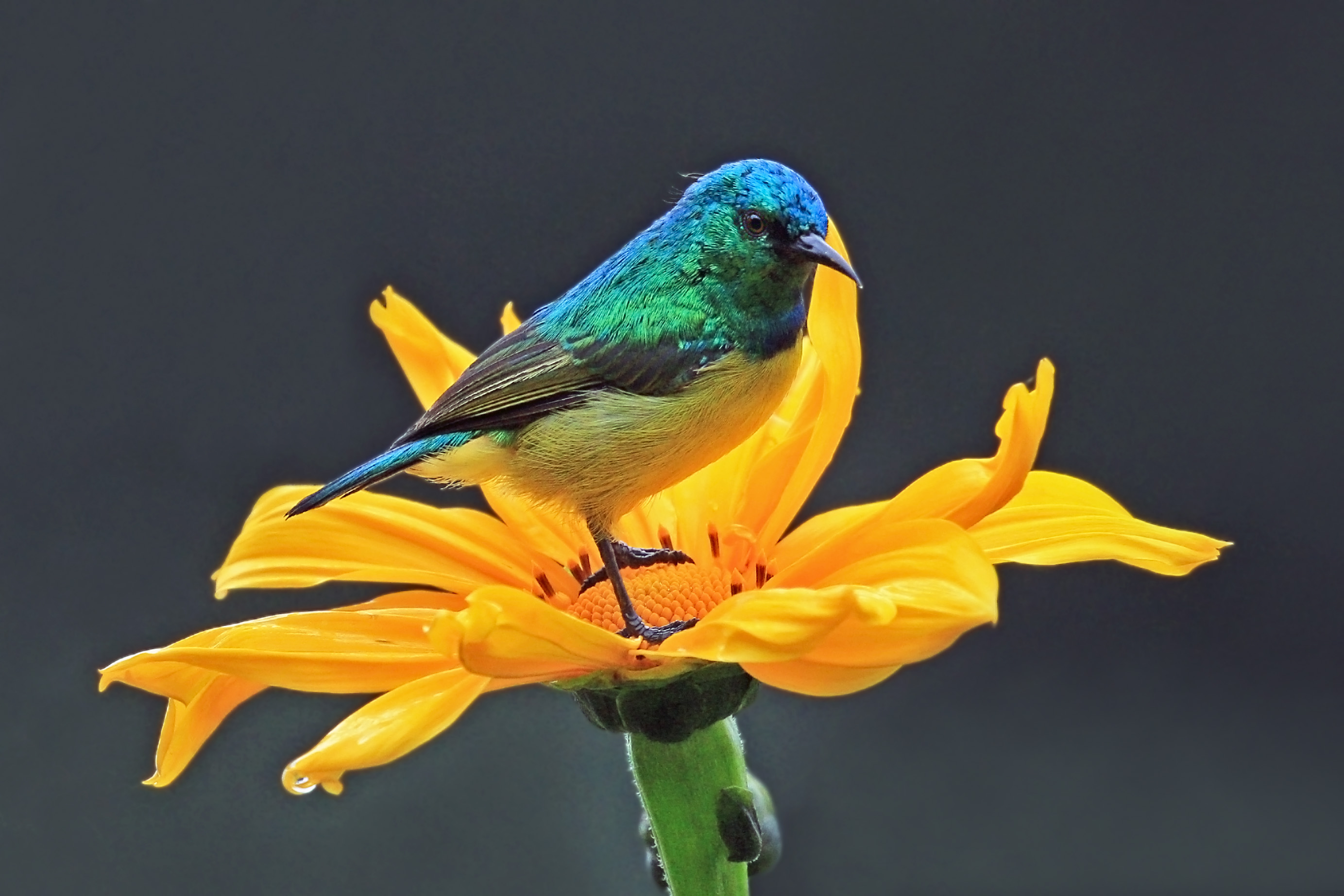
- male
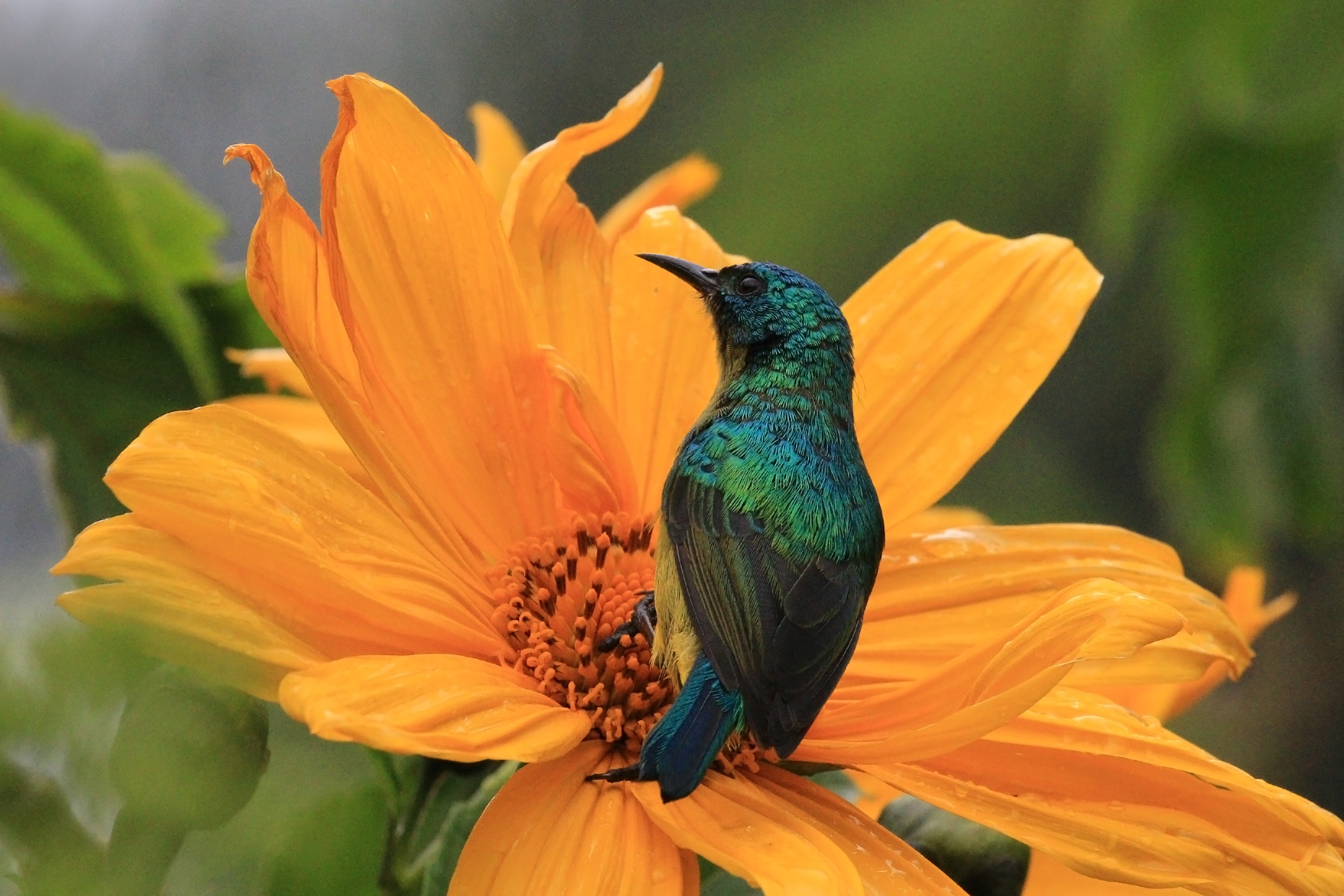
- female both Volcanoes National Park, Rwanda

Conservation status
- Least Concern (IUCN 3.1)

Scientific classification
- Kingdom: Animalia
- Phylum: Chordata
- Class: Aves
- Order: Passeriformes
- Family: Nectariniidae
- Genus: Hedydipna
- Species: H. collaris

Binomial name
- Hedydipna collaris (Vieillot, 1819)

Synonyms
- Anthreptes collaris Anthodiaeta collaris

= Collared sunbird =

Species of bird

The collared sunbird (Hedydipna collaris) is a bird species of the family Nectariniidae. The sunbirds are a group of very small Old World passerine birds which feed largely on nectar, although they will also take insects, especially when feeding young. The collared sunbird is in fact mainly insectivorous.

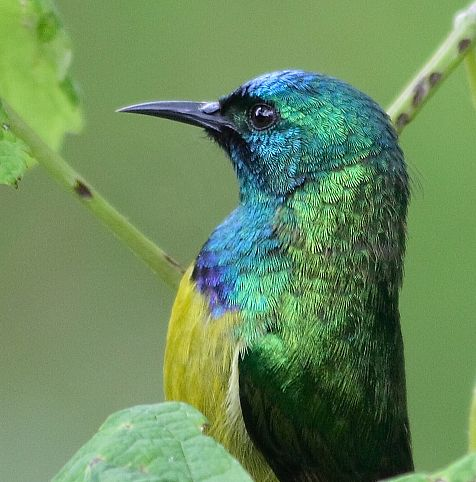
Male in a garden grapevine

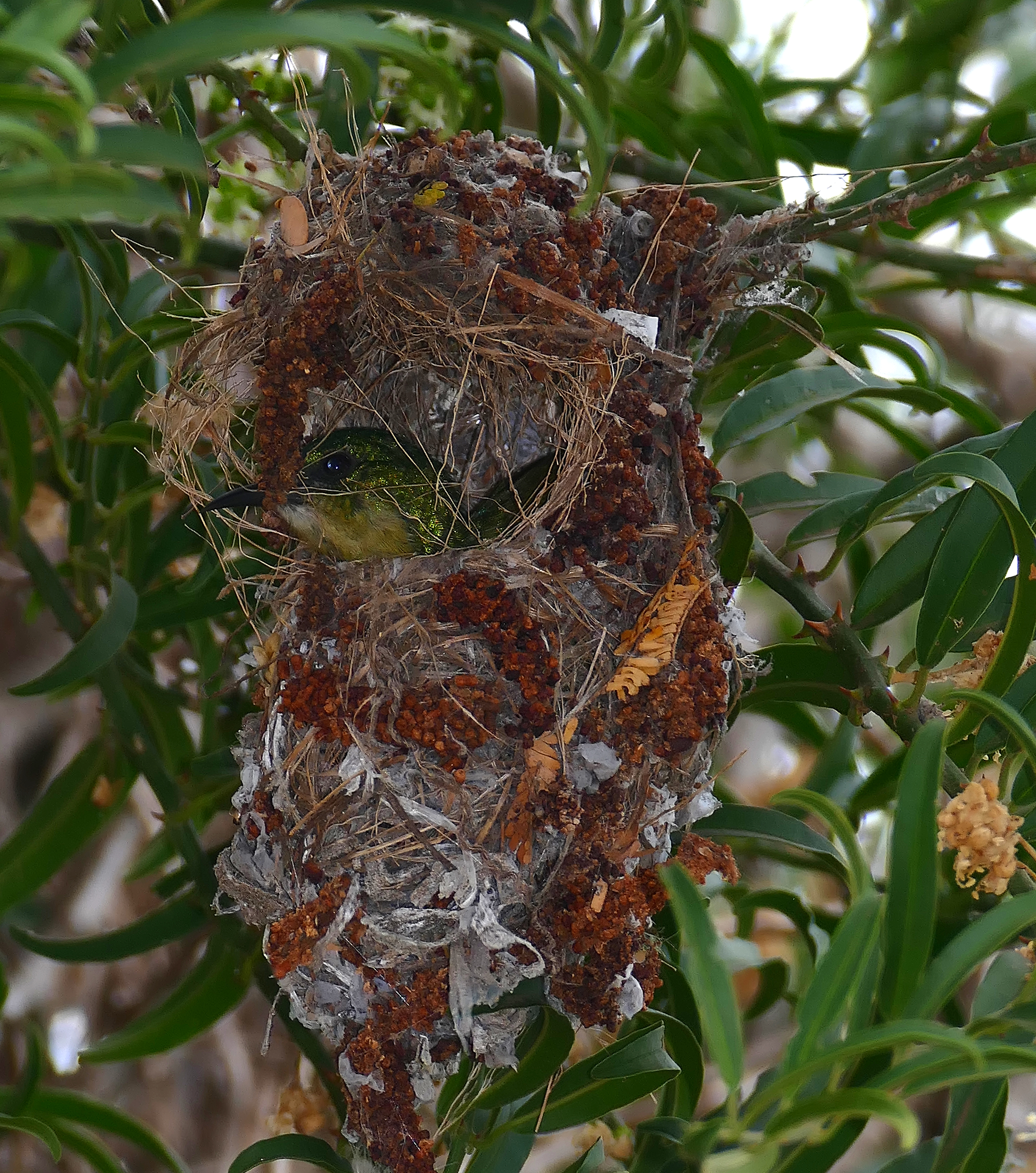
Female in nest

Sunbird flight is fast and direct on their short wings. Most species can take nectar by hovering like a hummingbird, but usually perch to feed most of the time.

The collared sunbird is a common breeder across most of sub-Saharan Africa. Two or three eggs are laid in a suspended nest in a tree. It is a seasonal bird migrant within its range.

Collared sunbirds are tiny, only 9–10 cm (3.5–3.9 in) long. They have short thin down-curved bills and brush-tipped tubular tongues, both adaptations to nectar feeding.

The adult male has glossy green upperparts and head with a yellow belly and narrow purple breast band. The female is a duller green above and entirely yellow below.

This species inhabits forests near water.
