= Ahriman (disambiguation) =

Ahriman, or Angra Mainyu, is the "destructive spirit" in Zoroastrianism.

Ahriman may also refer to:

== Religious concepts ==
- An entity in the philosophy of anthroposophy
- A name (Ahrimanius) inscribed on the lion-headed figure in Roman Mithraism

== Video games ==
- A race of monsters in the Final Fantasy game series
- Ahriman (Warhammer 40,000), a character in the Warhammer 40,000 game series
- Ahriman, an evil god in Prince of Persia (2008 video game)
- The titular character in Kohan: Ahriman's Gift
- A long-dead warlock in Ahriman's Prophecy, a title in Aveyond game series

== Other uses ==
- Ahriman (Highlander), a figure in Highlander: The Series
- Lord Ahriman, pseudonym of the founder and guitarist of the black metal band Dark Funeral
- Dr. Ahriman, a psychologist in False Memory (novel) by Dean Koontz
- R.E. Mann, a character in Asimov's short story The Last Trump
