= Armand (photographer) =

Armenian-Egyptian photographer

Armenak Arzrouni
- Born: Armenak Arzrouni; 1901; Erzurum, Ottoman Empire
- Died: 1963 (aged 61–62)
- Years active: 1925–1960
- Known for: portrait photography wedding photography

Armenak Arzrouni (Armenian: Արմենակ Արծրունի; 1901–1963), who worked under the mononym Armand, was a pre-eminent Armenian Egyptian photographer based in Egypt. He specialized in portrait photography, while carving a lucrative niche market. He became highly sought after by the Egyptian upper class and was the first photographer in Egypt to use photography umbrellas.

== Biography ==
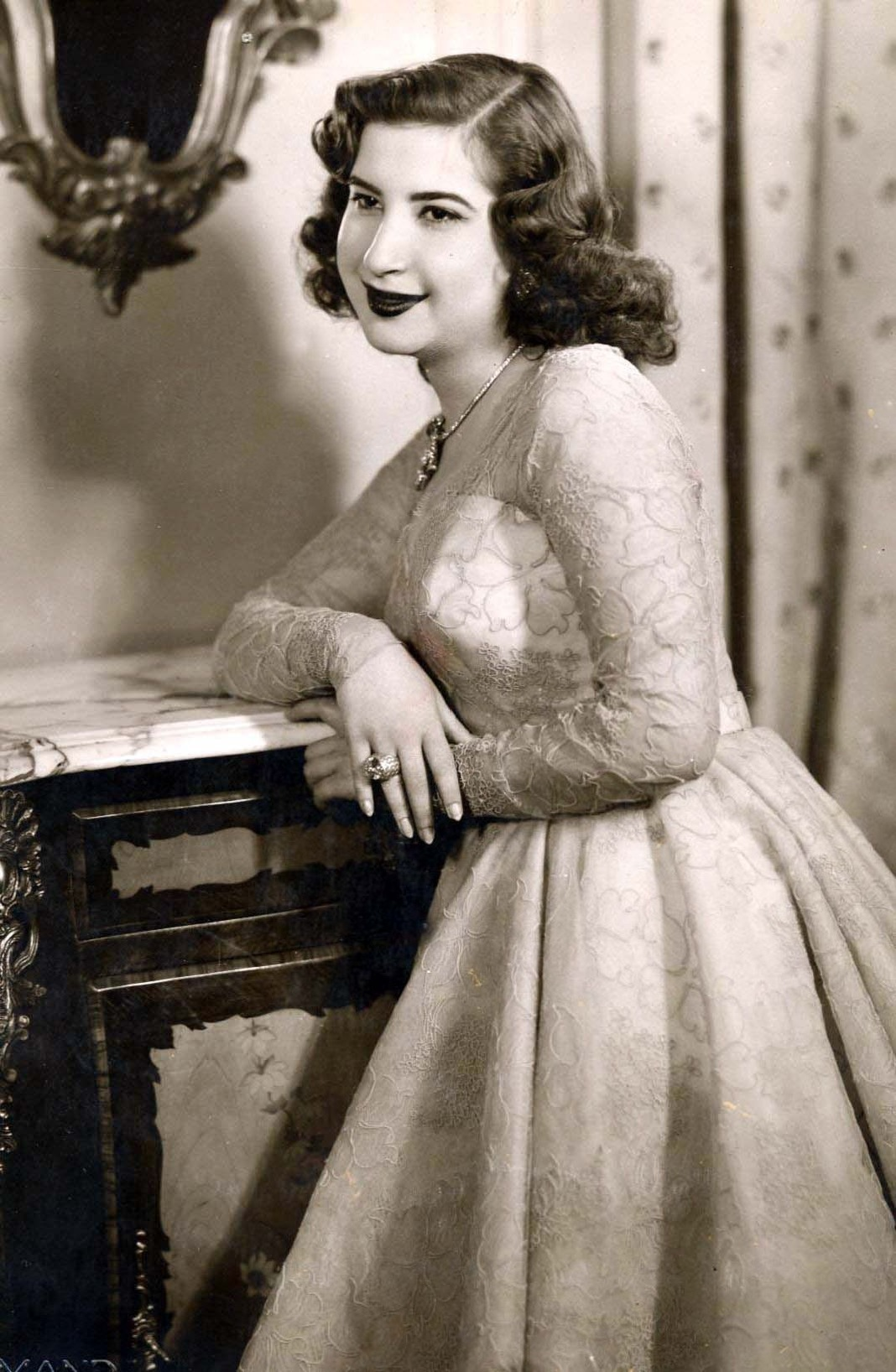
Queen Nariman, photographed by Armand, 1951

Born in August 1901 in Erzurum, then part of the Ottoman Empire, he came with his father to Alexandria, Egypt in 1907. At school, he had a passion for drawing. He started working as an apprentice under Nadir, a photographer based in Alexandria. In 1925, he went to Cairo as an assistant to Zola, an Austrian Jewish photographer and renowned portraitist, at his studio in Ard el-Sherif, near Midan Mustafa Kamel street. Zola sent Arzrouni to Austria to learn about the colorization of black-and-white photographs, as well as airbrush technique and the use of charcoal and chalk. Upon Zola's death in 1930, Arzrouni opened his own studio in Midan Mustafa Kamel under the name Armand Studio. His father built him a giant enlarger capable of handling negatives with large dimensions. By the mid-1950s, his first studio was threatened with destruction, so he opened a second studio in 1956, in Talaat Harb street. He specialized in portrait photography, and took photographs of politicians, film stars, famous cabaret dancers, as well as members of the royal family. The 1952 Revolution did not hinder his career, and he continued to take photographs of famous people, notably Gamal Abdel Nasser and foreign heads of state visiting Egypt. He was especially well known for the elaborate settings of his wedding photographs. He also occasionally received orders for photographs of hotels and department stores. His son Armand worked as his assistant as early as 1960, and took over the studio after his father's death in 1963. He signs his photographs in the same way as his father.
