= Al-Armani =

al-Armani (Arabic: الأرمني) is a nisba meaning "Armenian" or from the region of Armenia. It may refer to:

- Abu Salih Al-Armani, priest of the Coptic Orthodox Church of Alexandria
- Ali ibn Yahya al-Armani, Abbasid general
- Bahram al-Armani, vizier of the Fatimid Caliphate
- Muhammad ibn Ali al-Armani (died 873), Abbasid general
- Yuhanna al-Armani (c. 1720–1786), artist in Ottoman period
