= Armand Commission =

The Armand Commission was the first Commission of the European Atomic Energy Community (Euratom), between 1958 and 1959. Its president was Louis Armand of France. There would be two further Commissions before the institutions of Euratom were merged with those of the European Coal and Steel Community and the European Economic Community in 1967 to become the European Communities.

== See also ==
- Hirsch Commission (1959–1962)
- Chatenet Commission (1962–1969)
