= Arman Sedghi =

Iranian engineer

- Born: July 12, 1964 (age 62); Tehran, Iran
- Education: Iran University of Science and Technology
- Known for: Low cost carbon fibers
- Scientific career
- Fields: Materials science
- Workplaces: Imam Khomeini International University

Arman Sedghi is an Iranian engineer and assistant professor at Imam Khomeini International University. He is best known for his scientific achievement in production of low cost carbon fibers, and being highly experienced in fabrication and characterization of ceramic fibers and their composites.

== Education ==
He received Master of Science degree in September 1991 from University of Tehran and PhD in February 1996 from Iran University of Science and Technology. The title of his thesis deals with Carbon–carbon composites.
