= Saint Herman =

Saint Herman may refer to:

== People ==
- Saint Herman of Valaam, 12th century, the founder of the Valaam Monastery in Karelia, together with Saint Sergius of Valaam
- Saint Herman of Alaska (1756? – 1836)
- Saint Hermann of Reichenau (1013–1064)
- Saint Herman Joseph of Cologne (1150–1243)

== Other ==
- Saint Herman's Orthodox Theological Seminary in Kodiak, Alaska
- Saint Herman of Alaska Church in Espoo, Finland
