= Michael Herman (intelligence officer) =

British intelligence officer and academic (1929–2021)

- Born: 1929
- Died: 12 February 2021 (aged 91–92)
- Education: Scarborough High School
- Alma mater: The Queen's College, Oxford
- Occupations: Intelligence officer, author

Michael Herman (1929 – 12 February 2021) was a British intelligence officer for GCHQ and academic. He was a former Fellow at Nuffield College and St Antony's College at the University of Oxford, and the founder of the Oxford Intelligence Group. He was the author and/or editor of three books on intelligence, including Intelligence Power in Peace and War, described as "a key reference point for all those seeking to study the nature, roles and impact of intelligence as a state function, influencing a whole generation of academics drawn to its study."

== Early life ==
Herman was born in 1929. He was educated at the Scarborough High School and graduated from The Queen's College, Oxford, where he read Modern History. He served in the Intelligence Corps of the British Army in Egypt from 1947 to 1949. Herman died on 12 February 2021.

== Career ==
Herman worked for the Government Communications Headquarters from 1952 to 1987. During that period, he also worked as Secretary of the Joint Intelligence Committee in the Cabinet Office and as a staff member of Defence Intelligence. On retiring from GCHQ in 1987, Herman became a Gwilym Gibbon Research Fellow at Nuffield College, Oxford. He was subsequently an Honorary Departmental Fellow in the Department of International Politics at Aberystwyth University in Wales and a Senior Associate Fellow of St. Antony’s College, Oxford. He was also the founding director of the Oxford Intelligence Group. He gave evidence before the Butler Review in 2004. Herman was the recipient of the St Antony's plaque from St Antony's College in 2004, an Honorary Doctorate of Letters from the University of Nottingham in 2005 and the Lifetime Achievement Award from the International Association for Intelligence Education in 2016.

Herman was the author of two books and the editor of a third book, all of which are about intelligence. His first book, Intelligence Power in Peace and War, was published in 1996. It was reviewed by Percy Cradock in International Affairs, Michael I. Handel in The International History Review, and Jérôme Marchand in Politique étrangère. According to Professor Mark Phythian of the University of Leicester, the book became "a key reference point for all those seeking to study the nature, roles and impact of intelligence as a state function, influencing a whole generation of academics drawn to its study." In 2001, Herman published a second book, Intelligence Services in the Information Age: Theory and Practice. He co-edited Intelligence in the Cold War: What Difference Did It Make? with Gwilym Hughes in 2013.

== Works ==
- Herman, Michael (1996). Intelligence Power in Peace and War. Cambridge, U.K.: Cambridge University Press. ISBN 9780521562317. OCLC 33949126.
- Herman, Michael (2001). Intelligence Services in the Information Age: Theory and Practice. London, U.K.: Frank Cass. ISBN 9780714651996. OCLC 47658925.
- Herman, Michael; Hughes, Gwilym, eds. (2013). Intelligence in the Cold War: What Difference Did It Make?. London, U.K.: Routledge. ISBN 9780415659659. OCLC 825961995.
