= Hermann (name) =

Hermann or Herrmann is the German origin of the given name Herman.

People with the name include:

== Given name ==
- Arminius (18/17 BC – AD 21), the Roman name for a chieftain of the Germanic Cherusci, who defeated a Roman army in the Battle of the Teutoburg Forest; at one time his original name, which is unknown, was speculated to be Hermann, although more common Germanic given names are at least as likely, e.g. Ermen/Irmin "universal", "strong" etc.
- Hermann Abert (1871–1927), German historian of music
- Hermann Balk (died 1239), Teutonic knight
- Hermann Baranowski (1884–1940), German Nazi SS concentration camp commandant
- Hermann von Barth (1845–1876), German mountaineer
- Hermann Baumgarten (1825–1893), a German historian and political publicist
- Hermann Behrends (1907–1948), German Nazi SS officer executed for war crimes
- Hermann Berthold (1831–1904), Prussian and German printer
- Hermann Billung, a Margrave of Saxony
- Hermann Bondi (1919–2005), Anglo–Austrian mathematician and cosmologist
- Hermann Burmeister (1807–1892), German zoologist
- Hermann Ebbinghaus (1850–1909)
- Hermann Fegelein (1906–1945), Waffen–SS General
- Hermann Fressant, 14th century writer
- Hermann Goetz (disambiguation), several people
- Hermann Goldschmidt (1802–1866), German–French astronomer who discovered the asteroid Lutetia
- Hermann Göring (1893–1946), leading member of the NSDAP
- Hermann Grassmann (1809–1877), German linguist and mathematician
- Hermann Gundert, a German missionary who compiled the first Malayalam–English dictionary
- Hermann Harms (1870–1942), German botanist
- Hermann von Helmholtz (1821–1894), German physicist
- Hermann Hesse (1877–1962), German poet, novelist, and painter
- Hermann Hoth (1885–1971), German military officer
- Hermann Hreiðarsson, footballer of Icelandic descent
- Hermann Huppen (1938–2026), a Belgian comic book artist
- Hermann Kastner (1886–1957), German politician
- Hermann Lang (1909–1987), German race car driver
- Hermann Leopoldi (1888–1959), Austrian composer
- Hermann Loew (1807–1879), German entomologist
- Hermann Löhr (1871–1943), English composer
- Hermann Maier, Austrian skier
- Hermann Marx (1881–1947), German-born British stockbroker, banker, and noted print and book collector
- Hermann Merkin (1907–1999), Jewish–American businessman
- Hermann Minkowski (1864–1909), Lithuanian-born mathematician who devised the idea of four–dimensional spacetime
- Hermann Müller (disambiguation), the name of several individuals
- Hermann Muthesius (1861–1927), German architect
- Hermann Oberth (1894–1989), Romanian and German physicist
- Hermann Panzo (1958–1999), French sprinter
- Hermann Pister (1885–1948), German Nazi SS concentration camp commandant
- Hermann Peter Piwitt (1935–2026), German writer
- Hermann Ploucquet (1816–1878), German taxidermist
- Hermann Prey (1929–1998), German lyric baritone
- Hermann Rauschning, German conservative and reactionary, opponent of the Nazi party
- Hermann Rieck (c. 1837–1921), German-born pioneer farmer in Australia
- Hermann von Salza, Grand Master of the Teutonic Knights
- Hermann Saue (born 1939), Norwegian politician
- Hermann Scherchen (1891–1966), German conductor
- Hermann Schlegel (1804–1884), German ornithologist
- Hermann von Siemens (1885–1986), former head of German electronics company Siemens AG
- Hermann Stern (1878–1952), Austrian lawyer and politician
- Hermann de Stern (1815–1887), German–born British banker.
- Hermann Wendland (1825–1903), German botanist
- Hermann Weyl (1885–1955), German mathematician
- Hermann A. Widemann (1822–1899), German businessman and Kingdom of Hawaii cabinet member
- Hermann Wilken (1522–1603), German humanist and mathematician
- Hermann Winterhalter (1808–1891), German painter
- Hermann Zapf (1918–2015), German typeface designer

== Surname ==
- Albert Herrmann (1886–1945), German archaeologist and geographer
- Alexander Herrmann (1844–1896), German magician known as "The Great Herrmann"
- Arnulf Herrmann (born 1968), German composer
- August Hermann (1835–1906), German physical education instructor
- Bernard Herrmann (1911–1975), American composer
- Binger Hermann (1843–1926), American attorney and politician in Oregon
- Boris Herrmann (born 1981), German yachtsman
- Carina Hermann (born 1984), German politician
- Clara Herrmann (born 1985), German politician
- Claudine Hermann (1945-2021), French physicist
- Dana Herrmannová (1931–2024), Slovak television presenter.
- David Hermann (born 1977), a German–French stage director
- Dieter B. Herrmann (1939–2021), German astronomer
- Ed Herrmann (1946–2013), American baseball player
- Edward Herrmann (1943–2014), American actor
- Eleanor Krohn Herrmann (1935–2012), American nurse and educator
- Erika Hermann, birth name of Erika Steinbach (born 1943)
- Fernand Herrmann (1886–1925), French silent film actor
- Florian Herrmann (born 1971), German politician
- Franz Hermann (disambiguation), several people
- George H. Hermann, Hermann Park
- Georgina Herrmann (born 1937), British archaeologist and academic
- Grete Hermann (born 1901), German mathematician, philosopher, theoretical physicist, writer, and educator.
- Hajo Herrmann (1913–2010), German Luftwaffe (Nazi Germany air force) bomber pilot
- Hans Hermann (1870–1931), German composer, double-bassist and music educator
- Hans Herrmann (1928–2026), German Formula One and sports car racing driver
- Hans Herrmann (painter) (1858–1942), German landscape and genre painter
- Hans Herrmann (skier) (1892–1968), Swiss cross-country skier
- Helen Herrman, Australian psychiatrist and academic
- Jacob Herrmann, German rugby union international
- Jakob Hermann (1678–1733), Swiss mathematician
- Joachim Herrmann (born 1956), German politician
- Johann Hermann (1738–1800), French zoologist
- Johannes Hermann (1515–1593), German cantor, hymn writer and jurist
- Johann Gottfried Jakob Hermann (1772–1848), German classical scholar and philologist
- John "JoJo" Hermann, American musician
- Judith Hermann (born 1970), German writer
- Julian Herrmann (born 1995), German politician
- Kai Hermann (born 1938), German journalist
- Lars Herrmann (born 1977), German politician
- Ludimar Hermann (1838–1914), German physiologist and speech scientist
- Luke Herrmann (1932–2016), British art historian
- Mark Herrmann (born 1959), American football player and broadcaster
- Margaret Hermann (born 1938), American political psychologist
- Michael Herrmann (born 1944), German festival director
- Mirko Hermann (1868–1927), Croatian industrialist and businessman
- Moses Herrman (1858–1927), American lawyer, politician, and judge
- Ned Herrmann (1922–1999), American creativity researcher and author
- Paul Hermann (disambiguation), several people
- Peter Hermann (disambiguation), several people
- Peter Herrmann (1941–2015), German composer and academic teacher
- Robert Hermann (disambiguation), several people
- Vanessa Herrmann (born 1991), Thai actress and model
- Walter Herrmann (born 1979), Argentinian basketball player
- Walter Herrmann (physicist) (1910–1987), German nuclear physicist
- Wilhelm Herrmann (1846–1922), German theologian
- Winfried Hermann (born 1952), German politician
- Wolfgang A. Herrmann (born 1948), German chemist and academic administrator

== Fictional characters ==
- Herman Hermann, a one–armed character from the American TV series The Simpsons
- Hermann Dietrich (fictional character), a German army officer from the film Raiders of the Lost Ark

== See also ==
- Hermann (disambiguation)
- Herman (name)
- Hermans
- Arman (name)
- Armand (name)
- Germanus (disambiguation)
- Germán
- Germain (disambiguation)
