= Maroth =

- Municipality
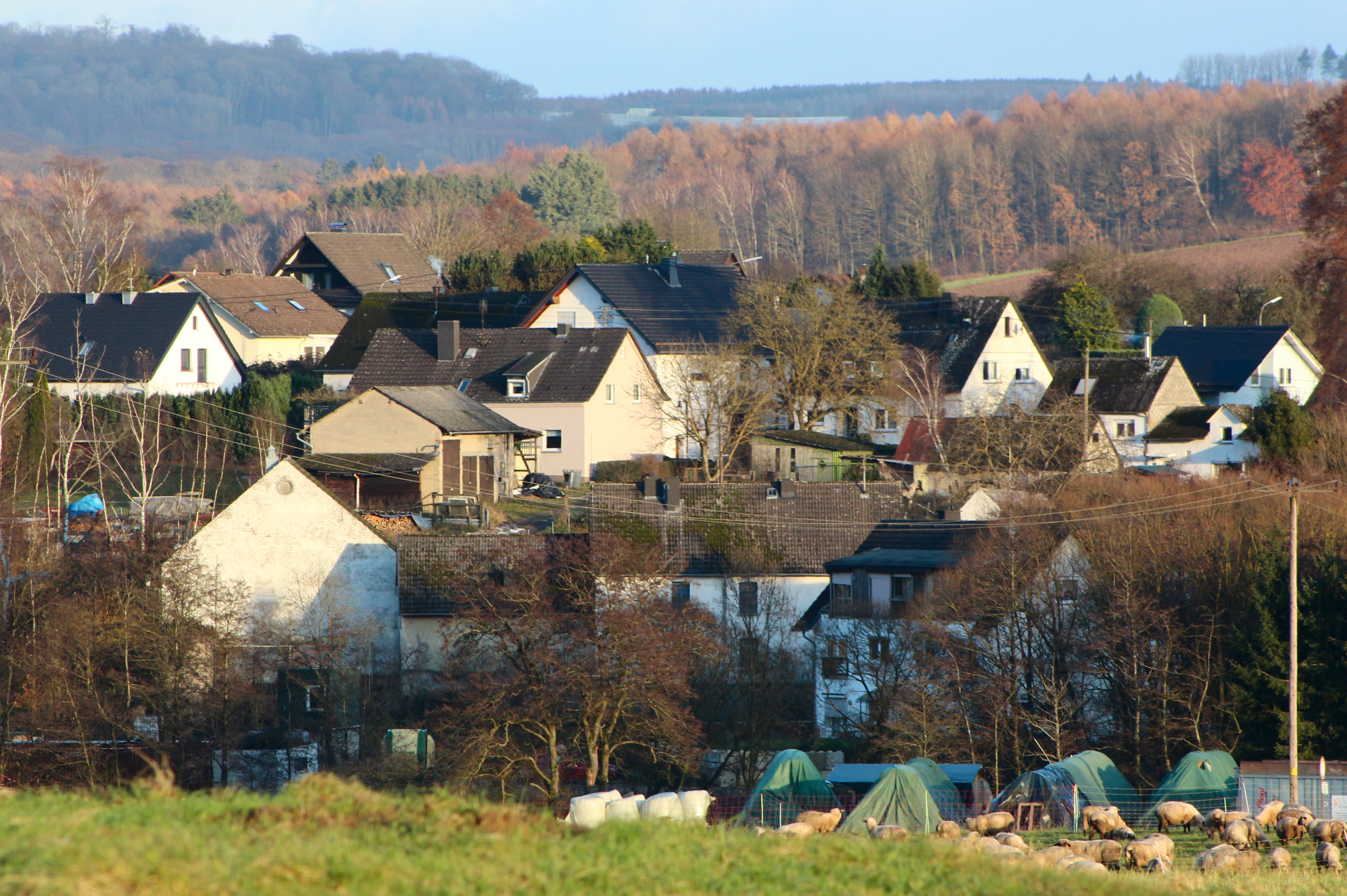

- Coat of arms

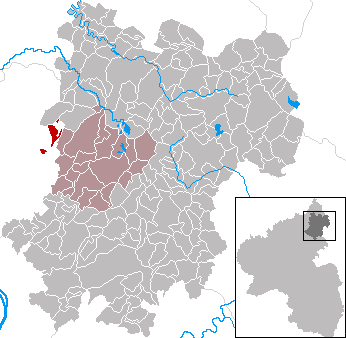
- Location of Maroth within Westerwaldkreis district
- Interactive map of Maroth
- Location within Germany Location within Rhineland-Palatinate
- Coordinates: 50°34′38″N 7°41′23″E
- Country: Germany
- State: Rhineland-Palatinate
- District: Westerwaldkreis
- Municipal assoc.: Selters (Westerwald)

Government
  - Mayor (2019–24): Gerhard Willms

Area
  - Total: 3.43 km^{2} (1.32 sq mi)
- Elevation: 280 m (920 ft)

Population (2025-12-31)
  - Total: 255
  - Density: 74.3/km^{2} (193/sq mi)
- Time zone: UTC+01:00 (CET)
  - Summer (DST): UTC+02:00 (CEST)
- Postal codes: 56271
- Dialling codes: 02689
- Vehicle registration: WW

Maroth is an Ortsgemeinde – a community belonging to a Verbandsgemeinde – in the Westerwaldkreis in Rhineland-Palatinate, Germany.

== Geography ==
The locality belongs to the area Westerwaldkreis - village Maroth with the degree of 7.68755 is obendrein WW is the license plate of Maroth - The locality has a population of 224 inhabitants Country code 02689 in addition the municipality has the postal code 56271.

== History ==
In 1344, Maroth had its first documentary mention. Maroth was once split into two. Witness to the former division of Maroth, formerly known as Malre, Maillrode, Mairot and Moort, and Hausen, formerly known as Huissen, Isenburgshausen and Trierischhausen, are the two outliers that can still be seen today. The municipal area even now is not fully contiguous, and two exclaves that can be reached only by crossing Marienhausen’s or Dierdorf’s municipal area are to be found outside the community’s main territory. In 1972, in the course of municipal restructuring, the Verbandsgemeinde of Selters was founded, to which Maroth belongs.

== Politics ==
The municipal council is made up of 6 council members, as well as the honorary and presiding mayor (Ortsbürgermeister), who were elected in a majority vote in a municipal election on 13 June 2004.

== Economy and infrastructure ==
Southwest of the community runs Bundesstraße 413, leading from Bendorf to Hachenburg. The nearest Autobahn interchange is Dierdorf on the A 3 (Cologne–Frankfurt). The nearest InterCityExpress stop is the railway station at Montabaur on the Cologne-Frankfurt high-speed rail line.

== Sons and daughters ==
- Manfred Werz (* 1933) - Engineer and former president of the Federal Association of Road and Traffic Engineers (Bundesvereinigung der Straßenbau- und Verkehrsingenieure) from 1990 to 1993 and Road Administration Rheinland-Pfalz (de:Landesbetrieb Mobilität Rheinland-Pfalznverwaltung Rheinland-Pfalz) from 1995 to 1998.
  - Andreas Werz (* 1960) - International concert pianist, artistic director of Philip Lorenz International Keyboard Concerts, and music professor at California State University, Fresno.

== Clubs ==
- Angelverein "Waldsee Maroth" e.V. (angling)
- Förderverein der Freiwilligen Feuerwehr Maroth 1955/1996 e.V.
  founded 1955, founding members: 13 (Volunteer fire brigade promotional club)
- Freiwillige Feuerwehr Maroth
  founded 1955, founding members: 9 (Volunteer fire brigade)
- Jugendfeuerwehr Maroth
  founded 1 April 1995, founding members: 17 (9 girls and 8 boys) (Youth fire brigade)
- Kirchenchor Cäcilia Marienhausen/Maroth (church choir)
- Kur- und Verkehrsverein "Waldsee Maroth" e.V.
  founded 1972
- RZuF-Verein Gestüt am Waldsee, Maroth e.V. (stud farm)
- Verein für historische Fahrzeuge und Technik
  founded 9 December 2005 (Historic vehicles and technology)
