= Franz Hermann =

Franz Hermann may refer to:

- Hermann Franz Joseph Hubertus Maria Anschütz-Kaempfe (1872–1931), German art historian and inventor
- Franz Hermann von Bodmann (1908–1945), German SS-Obersturmführer
- Franz-Josef Hermann Bode (born 1951), German Catholic prelate
- Franz Clemens Honoratus Hermann Josef Brentano (1838–1917), German philosopher and psychologist
- Franz-Hermann Brüner (1945–2010), German public official and director-general of the European Anti-Fraud Office
- Franz Hermann Günther von Etzel (1862–1948), German general during World War I
- Franz Hermann Reinhold von Frank (1827–1894), German theologian
- Hermann Franz (1891–1969), German police commander for Nazi Germany
- Franz Georg Hermann (1692–1768), German Baroque painter
- Franz Hermann Glandorf (1689–?), German Jesuit missionary in New Spain
- Ernst Franz Hermann Happel (1925–1992), Austrian football player and manager
- Franz Ludwig Hermann (1723–1791), German fresco painter
- Franz-Peter Hermann (born 1952), German football coach and former player
- Hermann, Prince of Hohenlohe-Langenburg (1832–1913), 6th Prince of Hohenlohe-Langenburg
- Franz Maria Johann Joseph Hermann, 4th Prince of Khevenhüller-Metsch (1762–1837), Austrian aristocrat
- Hermann Franz Moritz Kopp (1817–1892), German chemist
- Franz Hermann Anton Magill (1900–1972), German Schutzstaffel officer and riding instructor
- Hermann Franz Mark (1895–1992), Austrian–American chemist
- Franz Ludwig Hermann von Milde (1855–1929), German operatic baritone and voice teacher
- Franz Joseph Hermann von Papen (1879–1969), Chancellor of Germany in 1932
- Hermann Franz Johannes Reuschle (1890–1949), German Olympic gymnast
- Franz Hermann Rolle (1864–1929), German natural history dealer and malacologist
- Franz Hermann von Roques (1877–1967), German general during World War II
- Franz Hermann Schultz Ramírez (born 1991), Chilean professional footballer
- Franz Hermann Schulze-Delitzsch (1808–1883), German politician and economist
- Waldemar Franz Hermann Titzenthaler (1869–1937), German photographer
- Franz Hermann Troschel (1810–1882), German zoologist.

== See also ==
- Hermann (name)
- Max Verstappen (born 1997), Dutch and Belgian racing driver, used "Franz Hermann" as a pseudonym
