= Peter Hermann =

Peter Hermann or Herrmann may refer to:

- Peter Hermann (actor) (born 1967), American actor
- Peter Hermann (cyclist) (born 1963), Liechtenstein track cyclist
- Peter Hermann (footballer) (1952–2026), German football coach and player
- Peter Herrmann (1941–2015), German composer
- Peter Herrmann (social philosopher), German philosopher
- Peter Herrmann (judoka) in 1966 European Judo Championships
- Peter Herrmann, voice actor in Happy Tree Friends

== See also ==
- Hermann (name)
- Pete Herman (1896–1973), American boxer
