= Hermans =

Hermans is a Dutch patronymic surname, cognate with German Hermann and Hermanns and the Scandinavian Hermansen. It is the 14th most common name in Belgium, with 12,794 people named Hermans in 2008. In the Netherlands, 10,641 people carried the name in 2007.

== People ==
- Alex Hermans, Belgian Paralympian shot putter
- Ben Hermans (born 1986), Belgian bicyclist
- Baldur Hermans, (1936–2015) German historian & scout
- Charles Hermans (1839–1924), Belgian painter
- Edwin Hermans (born 1974), Dutch footballer
- Elisabeth Hermans, Belgian soprano
- Femke Hermans, Belgian boxer
- Hubert Hermans (born 1937), Dutch psychologist
- Joannes Hermans, Flemish still life and animal painter
- Johan Hermans (born 1956), British botanist whose botanical abbreviation is Hermans
- Joseph Hermans (fl. 1920), Belgian archer
- Loek Hermans (born 1951), Dutch politician
- Margriet Hermans (born 1954), Belgian politician
- Mathieu Hermans (born 1963), Dutch bicyclist
- Otto Hermans (born 1950), Dutch politician
- Pierre Hermans (born 1953), Dutch field hockey player
- Toon Hermans (1916–2000), Dutch comedian, singer and writer
- Ward Hermans (1897–1992), Belgian Flemish nationalist politician and writer
- Willem Frederik Hermans (1921–1995), Dutch author

== See also ==
- Herman (name)
- Hermann (name)
- Hermansen
- Arman (name)
- Armand (name)
