= Großmaischeid =

- Municipality
- Coat of arms

- Location of Großmaischeid within Neuwied district
- Interactive map of Großmaischeid
- Location within Germany Location within Rhineland-Palatinate
- Coordinates: 50°30′17″N 7°38′02″E
- Country: Germany
- State: Rhineland-Palatinate
- District: Neuwied
- Municipal assoc.: Dierdorf

Government
  - Mayor (2024–29): Guido Kern (SPD)

Area
  - Total: 15.52 km^{2} (5.99 sq mi)
- Elevation: 280 m (920 ft)

Population (2025-12-31)
  - Total: 2,322
  - Density: 149.6/km^{2} (387.5/sq mi)
- Time zone: UTC+01:00 (CET)
  - Summer (DST): UTC+02:00 (CEST)
- Postal codes: 56276
- Dialling codes: 02689
- Vehicle registration: NR
- Website: www.grossmaischeid.de

Großmaischeid is a municipality in the district of Neuwied, in Rhineland-Palatinate, Germany.

It has approximately 2350 inhabitants and is placed in the Naturpark Rhein-Westerwald. The municipality is spelled with the 'sharp s' character ß which may ever so often be replaced by a 'ss', as e.g. in standard in English spelling or in the website www.grossmaischeid.de).

== History ==
First settlements in Großmaischeid date back to the late Bronze Age (1550 - 1200 BC). The Roman border fortification 'limes' was erected around 80AD in the vicinity of Großmaischeid. The town was first mentioned in an official document issued by pope Eugene III which dates back to 20 January 1148. Its name is most probably derived from 'Metsched's place', referring to a medieval local nobleman. It is assumed that the town as such was a planned settlement around the time of Charlemagne in order to stop the Saxons from expanding into western regions of Germany in the early 9th century. The town center is dominated by the catholic St. Bonifatius church which was first mentioned in 1555 and whose tower dates back to the 12th century. The town is situated 5 km south of the A3 motorway and about 75 km away from Cologne und 115 km from Frankfurt. Kausen, a former hamlet at the Saynbach river was included into the municipality of Großmaischeid in 1974. Larger cities in the vicinity of Großmaischeid are Koblenz and Neuwied, both of which are around 25 km away. A mere 1.5 km North of Großmaischeid (Maischeid-Major) is the former hamlet of Kleinmaischeid (Maischeid-Minor). Both places are sometimes referred to simply as Maischeid, referring to their common history.

== Culture ==
The local dialect in Großmaischeid is a moselle-frankonian. The town is known for its active community life driven by a series of themed clubs and amateur organisations such as the "Spielmannszug Großmaischeid 1959 e.V." (Spielmannszug is a kind of marching band). Highlight of the activities is the annual Carneval parade, traditionally held on 'Pancake Tuesday' (Veilchendienstag). The local Football team "Sportverein Maischeid e.V." is founded in 1923 and plays at the Waldstadion. The local primary school is named in honour of Hermann Gmeiner, the founder of SOS Children's Villages.

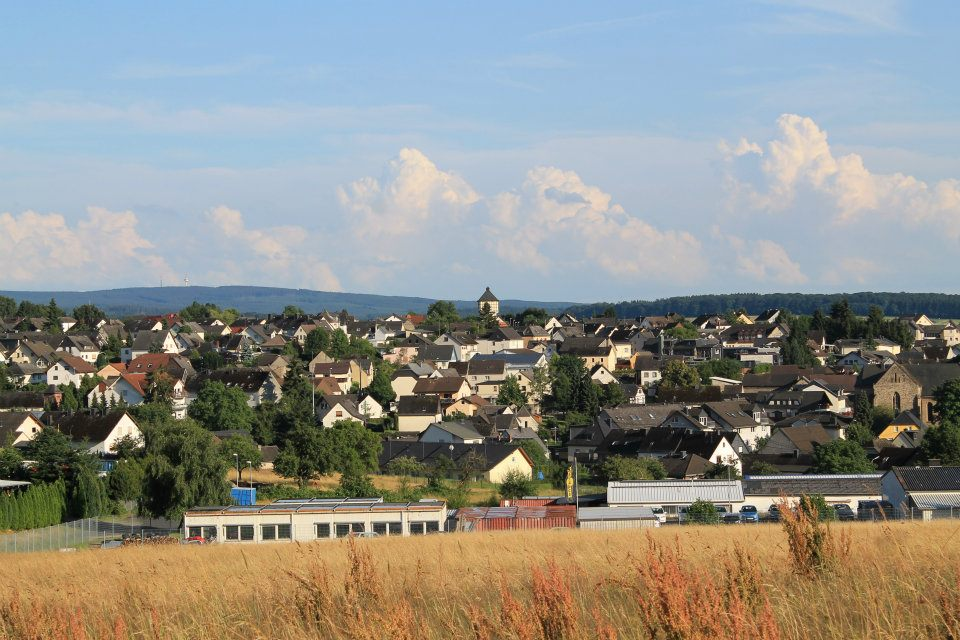
Großmaischeid from the North in June 2012

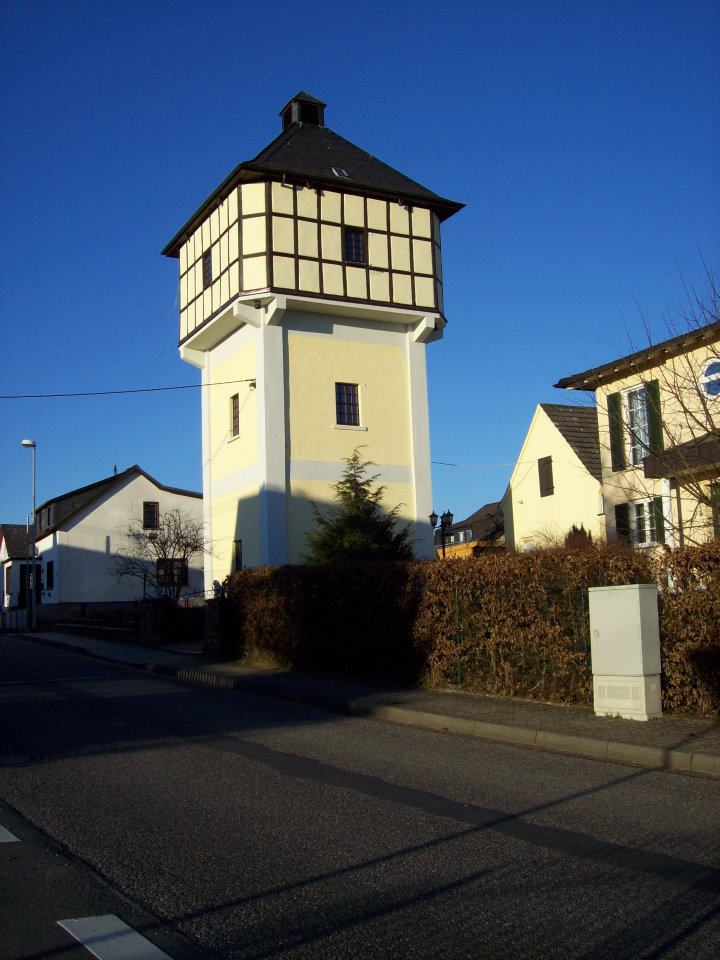
The landmark Wasserturm (Watertower) in Großmaischeid built in 1923

Frontview of St. Bonifacius Grossmaischeid
