= Paul Hermann =

Paul Hermann may refer to:

- Paul Hermann (botanist) (1646–1695), German botanist
- Paul Hermann (composer) or Pál Hermann (1902–1944), Hungarian composer and cellist of Jewish heritage possibly murdered by the Nazis
- Paul Hermann (1905–1958), author of Sieben vorbei und acht verweht - Das Abenteuer der frühen Entdeckungen, translated by Michael Bullock
- Paul Hermann (1904–1970), Nazi-era lyricist who revised the text of traditional Christian carol "Es ist für uns eine Zeit angekommen" to secular military lyrics

== See also ==
- Paul Herman (disambiguation)
- Paul Herrmann (born 1985), German short-track speed-skater
- Hermann Paul (1846–1921), German linguist and lexicographer
- Paule Herreman (1919–1991), Belgian actress
- Hermann (name), a surname and given name (including a list of people with the name)
