= Dierdorf (Verbandsgemeinde) =

- Verbandsgemeinde
- Location of Dierdorf within Neuwied district
- Interactive map of Dierdorf
- Location within Germany Location within Rhineland-Palatinate
- Coordinates: 50°33′N 7°39′E
- Country: Germany
- State: Rhineland-Palatinate
- District: Neuwied
- Seat: Dierdorf
- Subdivisions: 6 municipalities

Area
  - Total: 65.9 km^{2} (25.4 sq mi)

Population (2025-12-31)
  - Total: 11,235
  - Density: 170/km^{2} (442/sq mi)
- Time zone: UTC+01:00 (CET)
  - Summer (DST): UTC+02:00 (CEST)
- Website: vg-dierdorf.de

Dierdorf is a Verbandsgemeinde ("collective municipality") in the district of Neuwied, in Rhineland-Palatinate, Germany. The seat of the Verbandsgemeinde is in Dierdorf.

The Verbandsgemeinde Dierdorf consists of the following Ortsgemeinden ("local municipalities"):

1. Dierdorf
2. Großmaischeid
3. Isenburg
4. Kleinmaischeid
5. Marienhausen
6. Stebach
