= Paul Herman (disambiguation) =

Paul Herman (1946–2022), American actor

Paul Herman may also refer to:

- Paul Herman (decathlete) (born 1941), American who competed in the 1964 Olympics
- Paul Herman (basketball) (1921–1972), American basketball player

== See also ==
- Andrew Paul (born Paul Andrew Herman; 1961), English actor
- Paul Hermann (disambiguation)
