= Stebach =

- Municipality
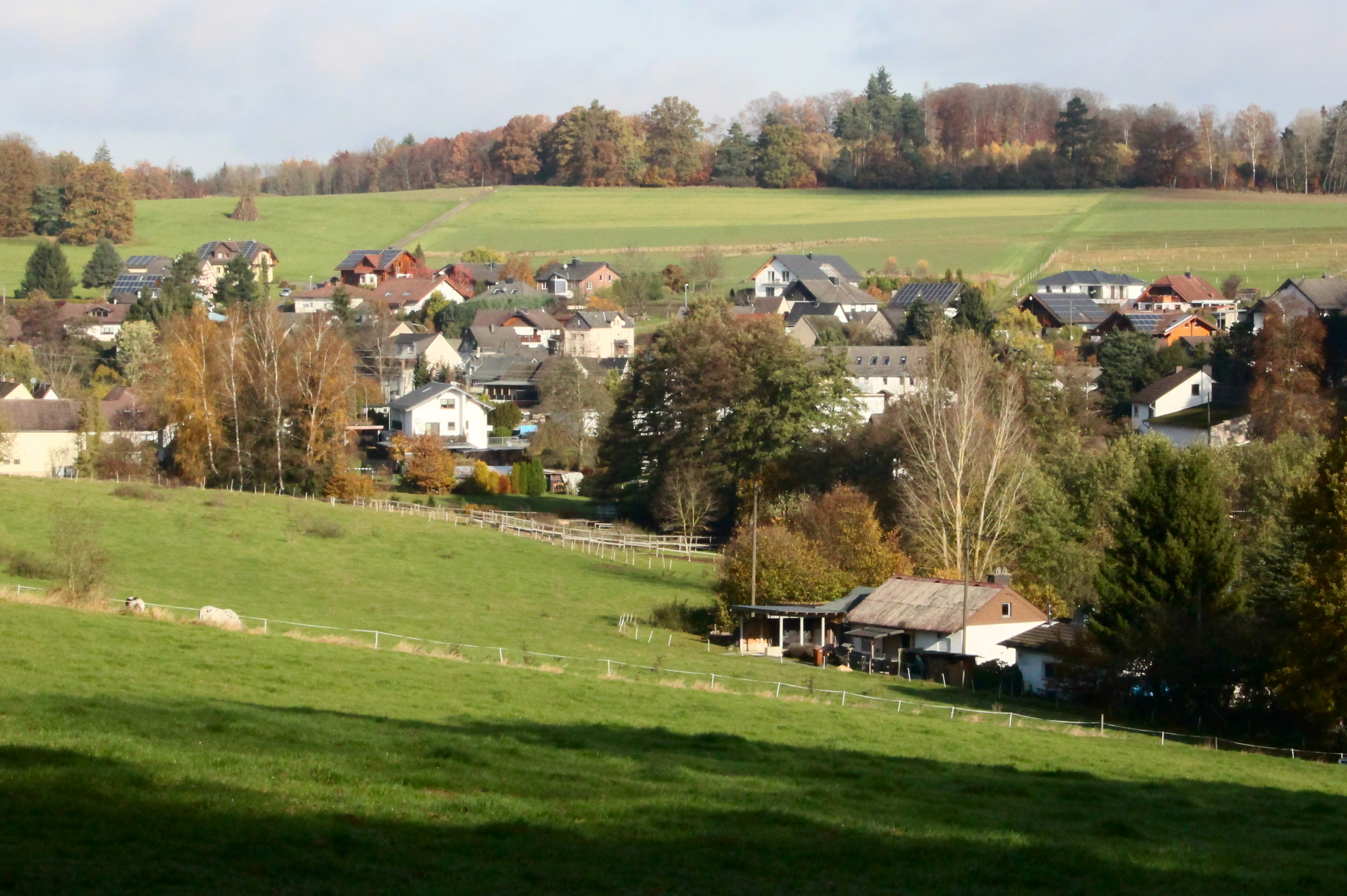

- Coat of arms

- Location of Stebach within Neuwied district
- Interactive map of Stebach
- Location within Germany Location within Rhineland-Palatinate
- Coordinates: 50°30′47″N 07°39′38″E
- Country: Germany
- State: Rhineland-Palatinate
- District: Neuwied
- Municipal assoc.: Dierdorf

Government
  - Mayor (2019–24): Karl-Heinz Klein

Area
  - Total: 2.38 km^{2} (0.92 sq mi)
- Elevation: 240 m (790 ft)

Population (2025-12-31)
  - Total: 360
  - Density: 150/km^{2} (390/sq mi)
- Time zone: UTC+01:00 (CET)
  - Summer (DST): UTC+02:00 (CEST)
- Postal codes: 56276
- Dialling codes: 02689
- Vehicle registration: NR
- Website: www.stebach.de

Stebach (German pronunciation: [ˈʃteːbax]) is a municipality in the district of Neuwied, in Rhineland-Palatinate, Germany.
