= Bayer 04 Leverkusen =

German association football club

Bayer Leverkusen
- Full name: Bayer 04 Leverkusen Fußball GmbH
- Nicknames: Die Werkself (The Factory XI); Die Schwarzroten (The Black and Reds)
- Founded: 1 July 1904; 122 years ago
- Stadium: BayArena
- Capacity: 30,210
- Owner: Bayer AG
- Chairman: Fernando Carro
- Head coach: Carles Martínez Novell
- League: Bundesliga
- 2025–26: Bundesliga, 6th of 18
- Website: bayer04.de
Home colours	Away colours	Third colours

Bayer 04 Leverkusen, officially known as Bayer 04 Leverkusen Fußball GmbH (German: [ˌbaɪ̯ɐ ˈleːvɐˌkuːzn̩]) and commonly known as Bayer Leverkusen or simply Leverkusen, is a German professional football club based in Leverkusen, North Rhine-Westphalia. It competes in the Bundesliga, the top tier of German football, and plays its home matches at the BayArena.

Founded in 1904 by employees of the paint factory, today better known as a pharmaceutical company Bayer (whose headquarters are in Leverkusen and from which the club draws its name), the club was formerly a department of TSV Bayer 04 Leverkusen sports club whose members participate in athletics, gymnastics, basketball, field and handball. In 1999, the football department was separated from the sports club. Bayer Leverkusen's main colours are red and black, which feature across their playing kits and badge, and their main rival is 1. FC Köln, while the fans have had a deep friendship with the supporters of Kickers Offenbach for almost 50 years.

Bayer Leverkusen were promoted to the Bundesliga in 1979 and won their maiden top-flight honor, the UEFA Cup, in 1988. The club won its first domestic honour, the DFB Pokal, in 1993. The club finished runners-up across three competitions in 2002, including the UEFA Champions League. After over 30 years without silverware, the club won their first Bundesliga title and their second DFB Pokal in 2024, becoming the first German team to win the league or domestic double unbeaten, while setting the European record for consecutive unbeaten competitive games (51).

== History ==
=== Origins and early years ===
On 27 November 1903, Wilhelm Hauschild wrote a letter – signed by 180 of his fellow workers – to his employer, the Friedrich Bayer and Co., seeking the company's support in starting a sports club. The company agreed to support the initiative, and on 1 July 1904 Turn- und Spielverein Bayer 04 Leverkusen was founded as a works team. On 31 May 1907, a separate football department was formed within the club. In the culture of sports in Germany at the time, there was significant animosity between gymnasts and other types of athletes. Eventually this contributed to a split within the club: on 8 June 1928, the footballers formed a separate association – Sportvereinigung Bayer 04 Leverkusen – that also included the handball and fistball players, athletics, and boxing, while the gymnasts carried on as TuS Bayer 04 Leverkusen. SV Bayer 04 Leverkusen took with them the club's traditional colours of red and black, with the gymnasts adopting blue and yellow after a while. Until 1930, Wiesdorf was the hometown of Bayer 04, and Leverkusen was merely the district where the factories and workers' housing were located. In 1930, Wiesdorf and the neighboring municipalities merged to form a new town. They named it Leverkusen because of the factory's importance, among other things, for the community's growth. Thus, the club now bore the name of its city.

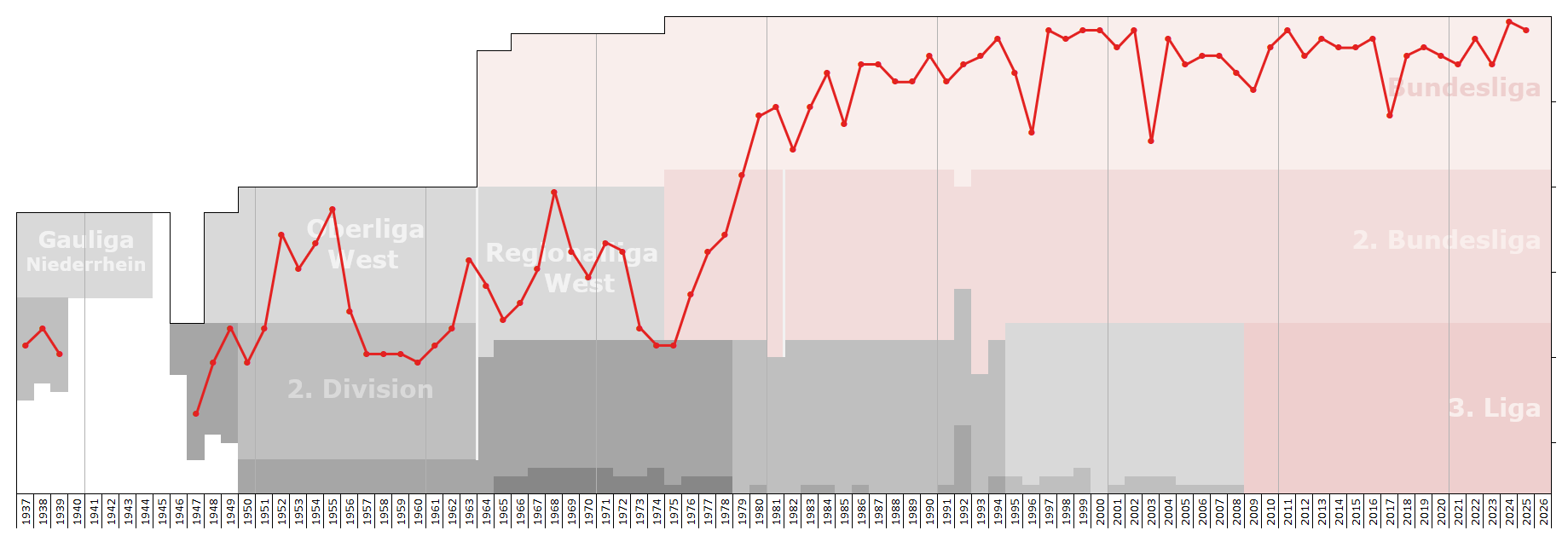
Historical chart of Bayer Leverkusen league performance after WWII

Through this period, and into the 1930s, SV Bayer 04 Leverkusen played third and fourth division football. In 1936, they earned promotion to the second highest class of play of the period. That was also the year that the club wore the "Bayer" cross, still visible on their kits, for the first time. They made their first appearance in upper league play in 1951, in the Oberliga West and played there until 1956, after which they were relegated.

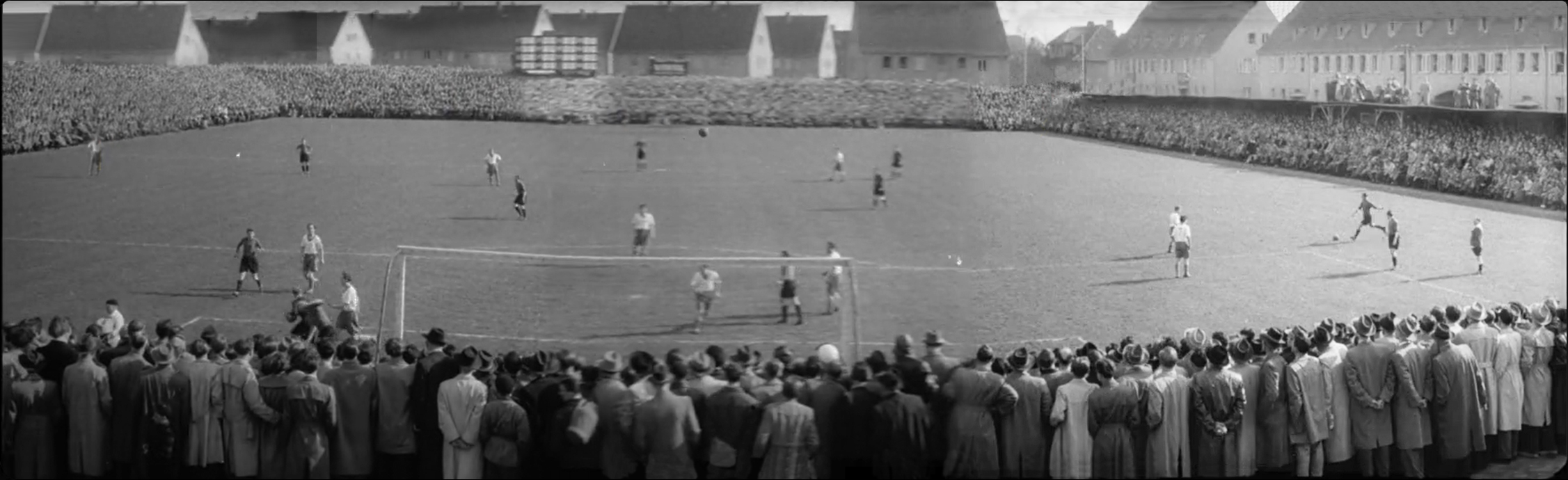
A freekick in the old stadium Stadtpark against SV Sodingen in 1955

SV Bayer 04 Leverkusen would not return to the upper leagues until 1962, just one season before the formation of Germany's new professional league, the Bundesliga. The next year saw the club in the Regionalliga West, tier II.

=== 2. Bundesliga to Bundesliga, UEFA Cup, and DFB-Pokal ===
After not having been among the top teams in the second-tier Regionalliga SV Bayer 04 Leverkusen made something of a breakthrough in 1968 by sensationally winning the division title (with only 15 men in the squad), but was unable to advance to the playoff round to the first division. The club was relegated again in 1973, but made a quick return to what was now called the 2. Bundesliga after just one season spent in the third division. Four years later, the club secured a place in the Bundesliga to start to play there in the 1979–80 season.

By the mid-1980s, SV Bayer 04 Leverkusen had become established in the upper half of the league table and was well-established there by the end of the decade. It was during this time, in 1984, that the two halves of the club that had parted ways over a half century earlier were re-united as TSV Bayer 04 Leverkusen e.V. The new club took red and white as its colours. Although the football department officially retained the colors black and red, the "Werkself" played in red and white for the next ten years.

In addition to becoming an established Bundesliga side, the club earned its first honours with a win in the 1988 UEFA Cup. Down 0–3 to Espanyol after the first leg of the final, Bayer Leverkusen drew even in the return match and then won the title on penalty kicks, 3–2.

That same year, long-time Bayer Leverkusen executive Reiner Calmund became the general manager of the club. The decade and a half following this saw club's greatest successes.

After the German reunification in 1990, Reiner Calmund was quick to sign prominent East German players Ulf Kirsten and Andreas Thom. After they were able to sign Matthias Sammer, who later became a world footballer, Chancellor Helmut Kohl vetoed the deal.

Calmund also established contacts in Brazilian football through player agent Juan Figer. Between 1987 and 1993, the club signed Brazilian internationals Jorginho and Paulo Sérgio. During this period, Leverkusen also acquired prominent German players, including Bernd Schuster and Rudi Völler, which helped increase the team's public profile and competitive performances.

The club won its next major honour in 1993 with a 1–0 win in the DFB-Pokal final against Hertha BSC second team (amateur squad) on 12 June 1993. In the following season, in a game in which Schuster scored a 45 metre "German Goal of the Year" (a goal which was later also named "Goal of the Decade").

After the club had almost been relegated in 1996 they regularly found themselves among the top three of the league under new coach Christoph Daum. In the next years they sign players such as Lúcio, Emerson, Zé Roberto and Michael Ballack. Daum was later fired for a cocaine scandal that also cost him his ascent to the role of the Germany national team coach.

=== "Neverkusen" ===
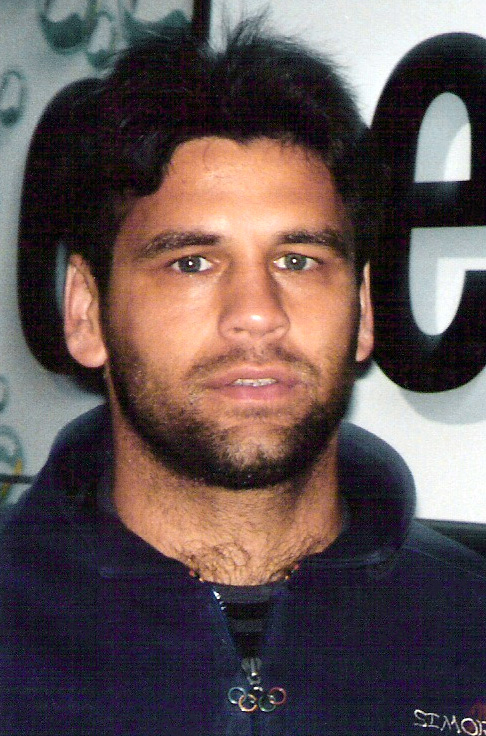
Ulf Kirsten, three-time Bundesliga top scorer

Leverkusen earned a series of four second-place finishes from 1997 to 2002. Most notably, the team had the Bundesliga title within their grasp in 2000 and 2002. In 2000, Leverkusen needed only a draw against SpVgg Unterhaching to win the title, but an own goal by Michael Ballack helped send the team to a heart-wrenching 2–0 defeat, while Bayern Munich won the title with a 3–1 victory over Werder Bremen. Two years later, the club surrendered a five-point lead atop the league table by losing two of its last three matches, while Borussia Dortmund swept ahead with three consecutive victories in its final matches. The 2002 season has been dubbed the "Treble Horror", as Leverkusen were also beaten 4–2 in the DFB-Pokal final by Schalke 04 and lost the UEFA Champions League final 2–1 to Real Madrid, which also led to some of the English-language media dubbing them "Neverkusen". Leverkusen was the first team to reach the final of the Champions League without ever having won a national championship. In addition, five members of the Bayer Leverkusen team were also members of the Germany national team which lost the final of the World Cup of 2002.

=== Subsequent years ===
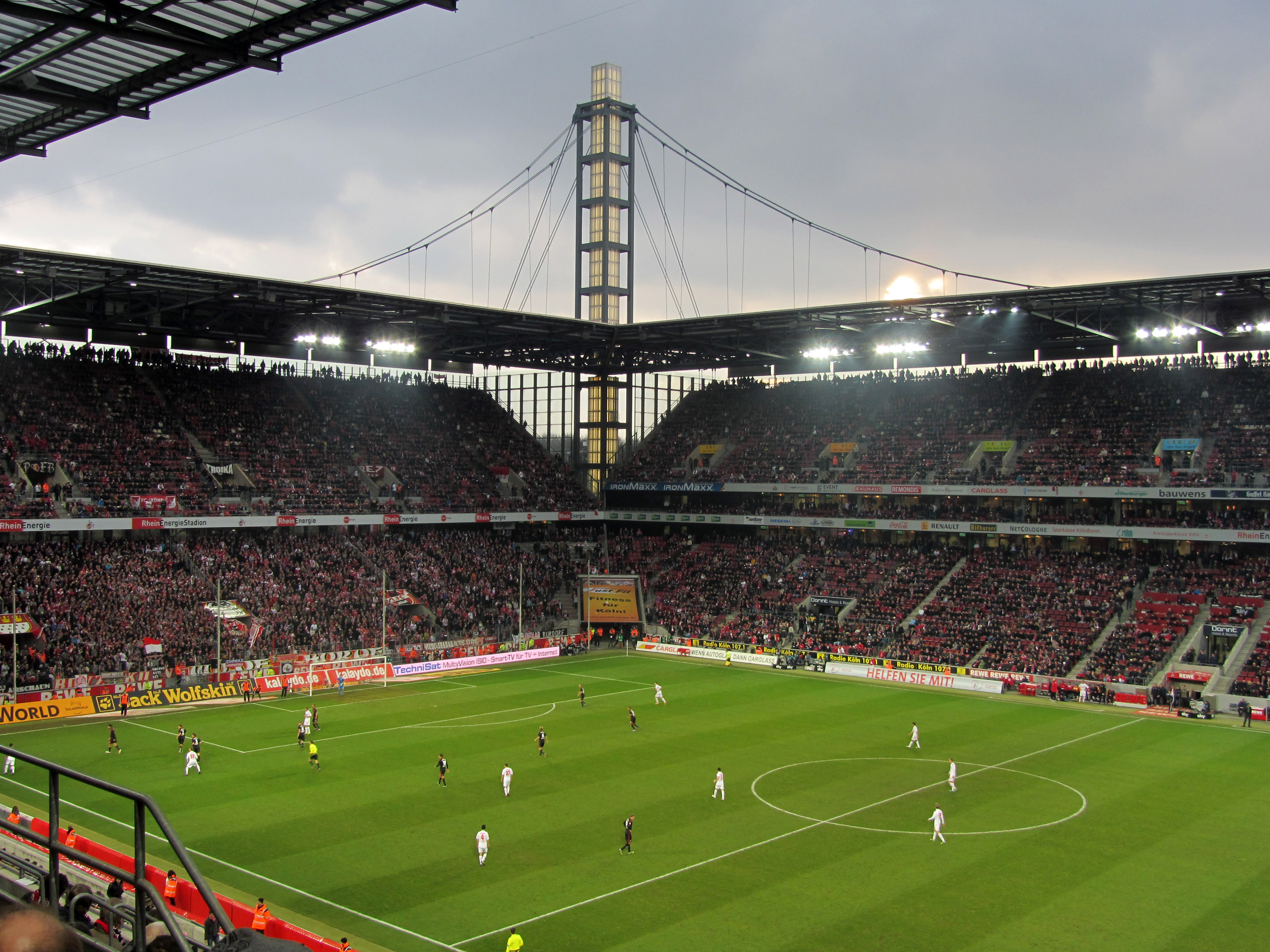
Leverkusen against rivals Köln in the Bundesliga in 2012

In the 2002 off-season, the team sold midfielders Michael Ballack and Zé Roberto to Bayern Munich. Klaus Toppmöller, who had coached the team during its most successful year, was replaced by Thomas Hörster. Klaus Augenthaler managed the last two games of the season with a win over his previous club, 1. FC Nürnberg. Bayer Leverkusen finished third-place in the Bundesliga and found themselves a Champions League place for the following year.

That following season's run in the Champions League saw the club open its group stage campaign with a 3–0 win against Real Madrid a result which helped Leverkusen to win the group. Leverkusen, however, was defeated in the first knockout round by eventual champions Liverpool. The club finished sixth during the 2004–05 season to qualify for the next season's UEFA Cup.

Early in 2005, Augenthaler was fired as manager after the club got off to its worst recorded Bundesliga start in over 20 years, with only one win in its first four league matches and a 0–1 home loss to CSKA Sofia in the first leg of its UEFA Cup match-up. Former Germany national team manager Rudi Völler, who had been named sporting director prior to the season, took charge of five matches as caretaker manager. Michael Skibbe, who was Völler's assistant coach with the national team, was named as his successor in October 2005. Skibbe turned Leverkusen's season around, and guided the club to a sixth-place finish in 2006, earning another UEFA Cup place, and then repeated that feat with a fifth place Bundesliga finish in 2007.

The 2007–08 season was not a successful one for Leverkusen despite a good start to the season; five out of the last ten league matches were lost to clubs in the lower half of the table. Michael Skibbe was heavily criticised towards the end of the season after he continuously changed his starting line up. Bayer Leverkusen also lost a lot of its support towards the end of the season: in the 1–2 home loss against Hertha BSC, the Leverkusen fans caused much commotion, with fans chanting for the sacking of Skibbe, while some Ultras, who had seen enough, set fire to their jerseys and threw them onto the field. Michael Skibbe was sacked soon thereafter, leaving the club on 21 May 2008, with club officials stating that his departure was due to the team not qualifying for the following season's UEFA Cup group stage.

The 2008–09 season got off to a great start for Bayer Leverkusen under new manager Bruno Labbadia, who the club had acquired from 2. Bundesliga club SpVgg Greuther Fürth. As the season progressed, however, the team secured no wins against top clubs in the Bundesliga. However, Leverkusen reached the DFB-Pokal final on 30 May 2009 in Berlin, but lost the game 0–1 to Werder Bremen. Leverkusen finished the season in ninth place in the Bundesliga table and Labbadia moved to Hamburger SV in June 2009. Shortly thereafter, Leverkusen presented Jupp Heynckes, who had previously managed Bayern Munich after Jürgen Klinsmann's departure, as its new manager. In the 2010–11 season, Bayer Leverkusen finished as runner-up, thus qualifying for the Champions League for the first time since 2005. However, Heynckes decided not to extend his contract and left Bayer Leverkusen in the 2011 close season to take over at Bayern Munich for a third time. In the 2012–13 and 2015–16 seasons, Leverkusen finished third with coach Sami Hyypiä and Roger Schmidt respectively, but were knocked out in the round of 16 of the Champions League the following season both times. In the 2019–20 UEFA Europa League, Leverkusen reached the quarter-finals for the first time since 2008, but were ultimately knocked out by Inter Milan in a 2–1 loss.

=== Xabi Alonso era (2022–2025) ===
==== From Neverkusen to "Neverlusen": unbeaten run (2023–24) ====
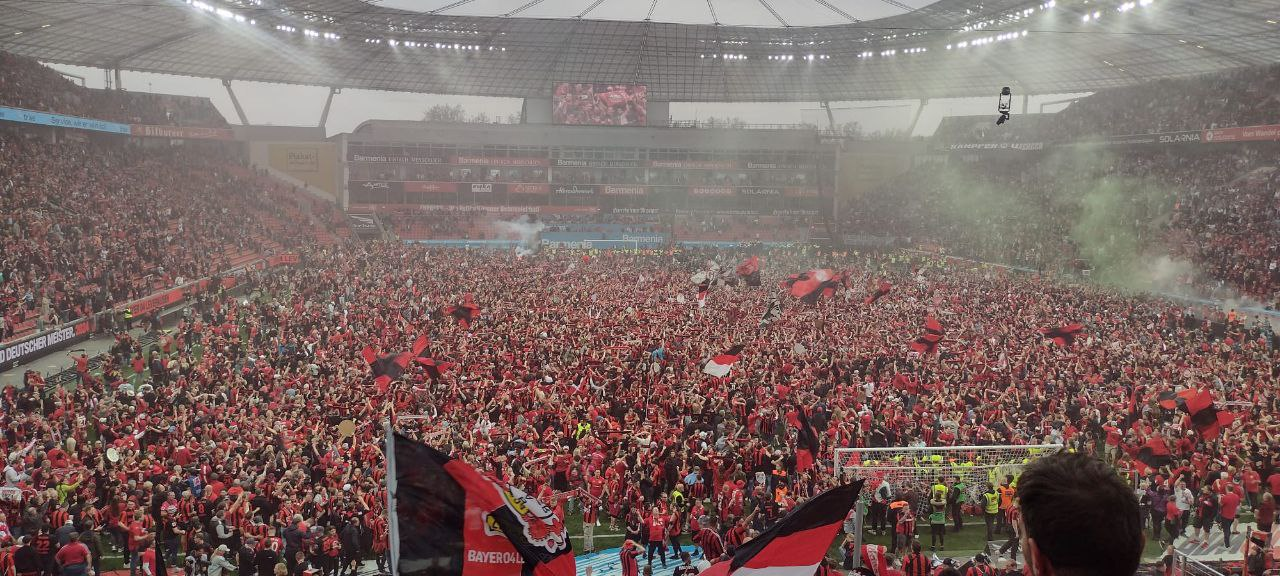
Celebration after the first win of the German Championship in 2024

In October 2022, with the club in the relegation zone, Leverkusen appointed Xabi Alonso as head coach in his first senior managerial role; he went on to guide the team to safety and a sixth-placed finish. In 2023–24, Alonso's first full season in charge, Leverkusen achieved significant domestic and European milestones, bolstered by effective squad building and strategic signings including Switzerland captain Granit Xhaka, Victor Boniface, Jonas Hofmann, Alejandro Grimaldo, and Matej Kovar. By early 2024, they had set a new club record for the longest unbeaten start to a season followed by breaking the Bundesliga record (formerly held by Hamburger SV since the 1982–83 season) for the longest unbeaten run by a club in all competitions with 26 games unbeaten followed by breaking the European record of the European "top 5 leagues" (Bundesliga, Premier League, Primera División, Ligue 1, Serie A) set by Juventus in 2011 and 2012 of 43 cross-competitive compulsory games in a row without defeat. On 14 April 2024, Leverkusen were crowned Bundesliga champions for the first time ever after beating Werder Bremen 5–0, ending Bayern Munich's run of 11 successive league titles. This was the club's first trophy since winning the 1992–93 DFB-Pokal. On 9 May 2024, Leverkusen set a new record for the longest run of matches without a loss in European football history (since the introduction of UEFA club competitions) following a 2–2 draw against Roma in the Europa League; they broke the previous record of 48 set by Benfica between 1963 and 1965. Leverkusen then finished the league season unbeaten, the first club in the Bundesliga to do so. Their unbeaten streak ended in their 52nd game of the season with a hat trick by Ademola Lookman giving them a 3–0 loss to Atalanta in the Europa League final. They won the 2024 DFB-Pokal final by beating 1. FC Kaiserslautern to win the domestic double.

==== Downfall and unbeaten away game record (2024–25) ====
At the start of the new season on 17 August 2024, the team won the DFL-Supercup for the first time ever beating VfB Stuttgart after penalties. However, their domestic unbeaten streak ended on 31 August 2024 after a 3–2 home defeat to RB Leipzig. This led to a less successful season for Leverkusen as the club relinquished the Bundesliga title back to Bayern Munich who also beat them 5–0 on aggregate in the round of 16 of the Champions League. Leverkusen also lost in the semi-finals of the DFB-Pokal to third-tier side Arminia Bielefeld leaving them with the DFL-Supercup as their only trophy of the season. Xabi Alonso departed the club at the end of the season to replace Carlo Ancelotti as manager of Real Madrid, but his record of 34 unbeaten away Bundesliga matches still stands as of 2026

=== Post-Alonso era (2025–present) ===
On 26 May 2025, Leverkusen announced former Manchester United and Ajax manager Erik ten Hag would replace Alonso as head coach, with Ten Hag starting his job on 1 July 2025. Later that year, on 1 September, Ten Hag was sacked after only two league matches. Kasper Hjulmand was named as his replacement on 8 September 2025. On 1 November 2025, their unbeaten away run of 37 Bundesliga matches ended after a 3–0 away defeat to Bayern Munich

== Logo history ==
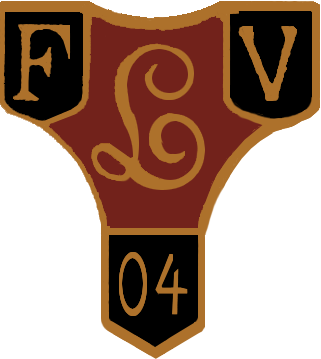
1923–1928

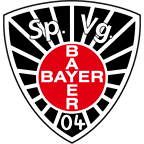
1928–1938

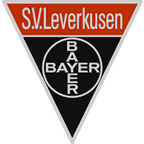
1948–1965

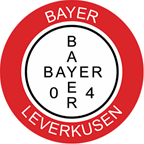
1965–1970

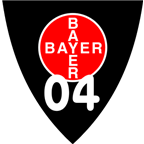
1970–1976

1976–1984

1984–1990

1990–1996

Since 1996

== Club culture ==
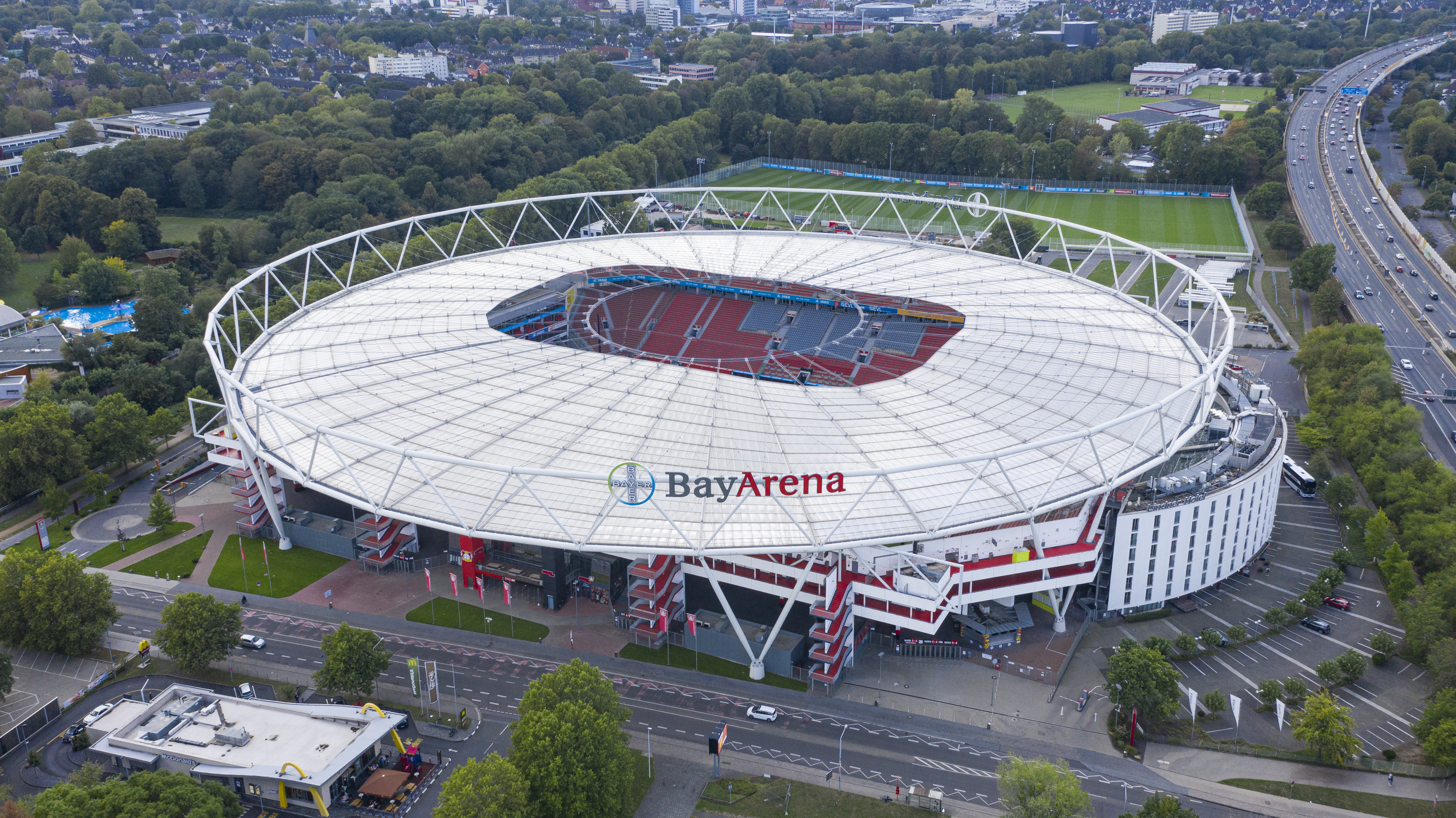
BayArena, the stadium of Bayer Leverkusen

The 50+1 rule in German football states that a club must hold at least 50 percent of the voting rights plus one vote in its spun-off corporation in order to maintain control. The goal is to limit the influence of external investors and protect the club's structure. However, there are two exceptions: Leverkusen and VfL Wolfsburg. Because these clubs were founded as works clubs and the corresponding companies supported the club financially, among other things, for many decades, the football department of Bayer 04 was spun off from the overall club in 1999 and has been a subsidiary of Bayer AG ever since. This allows to offset financial losses at the end of a fiscal year, but also requires profits to be transferred.

However, a ruling by the Federal Cartel Office from 2025 identifies a need for improvements regarding the exemptions. Therefore, it can be assumed that the German Football League (DFL) will demand more say for the parent club TSV Bayer 04 Leverkusen e.V. in the future, or that members will have to be more closely involved in other ways.

Bayer 04 was the first Bundesliga club whose fans identified themselves as Ultras. Even though the club was founded at the beginning of the 20th century on the initiative of the employees and even aldo had roots as a works club in the socialist-influenced workers' sports movement (the workers' sports club Germania Wiesdorf [unique example of a socialist workers sports club that was supported by a factory] was absorbed into TUS Bayer 04 after being banned by the National Socialists), many fans of other clubs criticise Bayer Leverkusen as being a "plastic club", existing solely as a creation of their rich pharmaceutical company sponsor – Bayer AG. As a result, the club and their fans have started to emphasize their industrial origins with pride, calling themselves "Werkself" (Eng. "Company Eleven", "Factory team", "Millhanders") or "Pillendreher" (Eng. "Tablet twisters").

Bayer Leverkusen's corporate origins, however, are far from unique. Other clubs, including PSV, FC Carl Zeiss Jena, Arsenal F.C., West Ham United F.C. and Stade de Reims also founded as works teams. In addition, it is often forgotten that until 1999, the football department of Bayer 04 was part of the still existing parent club TSV Bayer 04 e.V. in accordance with the 50+1 rule, which has since become one of the most successful sports clubs in Germany. As distinguished from the various Red Bull teams (Salzburg, New York, Leipzig, Bragantino and Omiya Ardija) which were established or redefined in the early 21st century primarily for commercial reasons, the formation of Bayer Leverkusen was motivated by the idea of promoting the living conditions of local factory workers early in the 20th century. In view of this tradition, UEFA allows Bayer Leverkusen to use the brand name Bayer in club competitions, while disallowing such naming practices, most notably to Red Bull Salzburg (known as FC Salzburg in international competitions with modified crest).

== Charity ==
In March 2020, Bayer Leverkusen, Borussia Dortmund, Bayern Munich, and RB Leipzig, the four German UEFA Champions League teams for the 2019–20 season, collectively gave €30 million to Bundesliga and to Bundesliga teams that were struggling financially during the COVID-19 pandemic.

== Honours ==
=== Domestic ===
==== League ====
- Bundesliga
  - Winners: 2023–24
  - Runners-up: 1996–97, 1998–99, 1999–2000, 2001–02, 2010–11, 2024–25
- 2. Bundesliga North
  - Winners: 1978–79

==== Cup ====
- DFB-Pokal
  - Winners: 1992–93, 2023–24
  - Runners-up: 2001–02, 2008–09, 2019–20
- DFL-Supercup
  - Winners: 2024
  - Runners-up: 1993

=== Europe ===
- UEFA Champions League
  - Runners-up: 2001–02
- UEFA Cup / UEFA Europa League
  - Winners: 1987–88
  - Runners-up: 2023–24

=== Youth ===
- German Under 19 Championship
  - Winners: 1986, 2000, 2007
  - Runners-up: 1995, 2001, 2003, 2010
- German Under 17 Championship
  - Winners: 1992, 2016
- Under 19 Bundesliga
  - Winners: 2007, 2010

=== In Europe ===
As of 23 October 2024

Competition	Pld	W	D	L	GF	GA	GD	Win %
UEFA Champions League	120	45	27	48	177	181	−4	37.50
UEFA Cup/Europa League	141	73	31	37	253	144	+109	51.77
UEFA Cup Winners' Cup	6	3	2	1	15	8	+7	50.00
Total	267	121	60	86	445	333	+112	45.32

== Players ==
=== Current squad ===
As of 2 September 2026

Note: Flags indicate national team as defined under FIFA eligibility rules; some limited exceptions apply. Players may hold more than one non-FIFA nationality.

No.	Pos.	Nation	Player
1	GK	NED	Mark Flekken
2	DF	ARG	Facundo Medina
3	DF	ESP	Miguel Gutiérrez
4	DF	ENG	Jarell Quansah
5	DF	FRA	Loïc Badé
6	MF	ARG	Equi Fernández
7	MF	GER	Jonas Hofmann
8	MF	GER	Robert Andrich
9	FW	POR	Afonso Moreira
10	FW	USA	Malik Tillman
11	FW	FRA	Martin Terrier
12	DF	BFA	Edmond Tapsoba (captain)
14	FW	CZE	Patrik Schick
15	DF	GER	Tim Oermann

No.	Pos.	Nation	Player
17	FW	ESP	Lucas Vázquez
18	MF	GER	Kennet Eichhorn
19	FW	FRA	Moussa Diaby
20	DF	CIV	Guéla Doué
22	FW	NGR	Victor Boniface
23	FW	NGR	Nathan Tella
24	MF	ESP	Aleix García
28	GK	GER	Janis Blaswich
29	FW	MAR	Eliesse Ben Seghir
30	MF	ALG	Ibrahim Maza
35	FW	CMR	Christian Kofane
36	GK	GER	Niklas Lomb
42	MF	GER	Montrell Culbreath

=== Players out on loan ===
Note: Flags indicate national team as defined under FIFA eligibility rules; some limited exceptions apply. Players may hold more than one non-FIFA nationality.

No.	Pos.	Nation	Player
—	DF	BRA	Arthur (at Werder Bremen until 30 June 2027)
—	DF	FRA	Jeanuël Belocian (at Racing Santander until 30 June 2027)
—	DF	GER	Luca Erlein (at Energie Cottbus until 30 June 2027)
—	DF	FRA	Axel Tape (at Levante until 30 June 2027)
—	DF	MLI	Issa Traoré (at Trenčín until 30 June 2027)
—	DF	SEN	Abdoulaye Faye (at Celta Vigo Until 30 June 2027)

No.	Pos.	Nation	Player
—	MF	COD	Noah Mbamba (at Lorient until 30 June 2027)
—	MF	GER	Jeremiah Mensah (at Roda JC until 30 June 2027)
—	MF	GER	Francis Onyeka (at SV Elversberg until 30 June 2027)
—	FW	GER	Farid Alfa-Ruprecht (at Hertha BSC until 30 June 2027)
—	FW	NED	Ernest Poku (at Beşiktaş until 30 June 2027)
—	FW	UKR	Artem Stepanov (at Utrecht until 30 June 2027)

== Past players ==
=== Records ===
Players in bold are active.

Most Leverkusen appearances
Rank	Nat.	Player	Period	Apps
1	(Germany)	Rüdiger Vollborn	1982–1999	487
2	(Germany)	Thomas Hörster	1977–1991	453
3	(Germany)	Ulf Kirsten	1990–2003	448
4	(Germany)	Stefan Kießling	2006–2018	444
5	(Germany)	Carsten Ramelow	1996–2008	437
6	(Germany)	Jonathan Tah	2015–2025	401
7	(Germany)	Simon Rolfes	2005–2015	377
8	(Germany)	Gonzalo Castro	2005–2015	370
9	(Germany)	Bernd Schneider	1999–2009	366
10	(Germany)	Lars Bender	2009–2021	342

Top scorers
Rank	Nat.	Player	Period	Goals
1	(Germany)	Ulf Kirsten	1990–2003	240
2	(Germany)	Stefan Kießling	2006–2018	162
3	(Czech Republic)	**Patrik Schick**	2020–present	112
4	(Bulgaria)	Dimitar Berbatov	2001–2006	91
5	(Germany)	Herbert Waas	1982–1990	87
6	(Germany)	Christian Schreier	1984–1991	83
7	(Brazil)	Paulo Sérgio	1993–1997	64
8	(South Korea)	Cha Bum-Kun	1983–1989	63
9	(Argentina)	Lucas Alario	2017–2022	58
10	(Germany)	Karim Bellarabi	2011–2023	57
10	(Germany)	Florian Wirtz	2020–2025	57

== Coaching staff ==
As of 13 July 2026

Position	Staff
Head coach	(Spain) Carles Martínez
Assistant coach	(Spain) Pol García (Spain) Sergi Runge
Goalkeeping coach	(Germany) David Thiel
Goalkeeping coach (assistance)	(Germany) Jan Conradi
Head of performance	(Spain) Miguel Ángel Campos
Head of strength and conditioning	(Spain) Samuel López
Fitness coach	(Germany) Markus Müller (Germany) Jonas Rath (Brazil) Daniel Jouvin
Individual trainer	(Spain) Igor Labaien
Assistant coach analysis	(Germany) Marcel Daum
First team analyst	(Germany) Simon Lackmann
Head of sports science and fitness	(Germany) Dr. Malte Krüger
Sports scientist	(Germany) Prisca Volmary
Team liaison manager	(Germany) Hans-Peter Lehnhoff
Head team doctor	(Germany) Dr. Karl-Heinrich Dittmar
Team doctor	(Germany) Dr. Georg Tsironis (Germany) Dr. Philipp Ehrenstein (Germany) Dr. Stefan Porten
Head of physiotherapy and rehabilitation	(Germany) Sven Elsinger
Head physiotherapist	(Germany) Ill-Han Yu
Physiotherapist	(Germany) Florian Kroder (Germany) Jonas Schmitt (Germany) David Jann (Germany) Stephan Hartner (Germany) Hans-Jörg Schneider (Germany) Florian Cordes (Germany) Ahura Bassimtabar (Germany) Nematollah Beigizadeh
Head of support staff	(Germany) Christian Beckers
Support staff	(Germany) Martin Kowatzki (Germany) Markus Irmer
Sports nutritionist (External)	(Germany) Lena Kadlec
Head of department	(Germany) Carsten Rademacher
Rehabilitation trainer	(Germany) Gregor Stumpf (Germany) Vladislav Kats
Physiotherapist/ Rehabilitation trainer	(Germany) Philipp Karcher
Physiotherapist, Osteopath and sports scientist	(Germany) Tim Hielscher
Administrative management and medical assistant	(Germany) Sabine Christmann-Schaaf
Kitchen	(Germany) Alexander Wagner (Germany) Marius Kiepert (Germany) Claudia Ruchatz (Germany) Marcel Czmok (Germany) Heike Urban (Turkey) Hüsniye Süslü (Germany) Jutta Baer

== Coaching history ==
As of 4 June 2026

- (Austria) Lori Polster (1950)
- (West Germany) Raimond Schwab (1950–51)
- (West Germany) Franz Strehle (1951–53)
- (West Germany) Hans-Josef Kretschmann (1953–56)
- (West Germany) Emil Melcher (1956–57)
- (West Germany) Edmund Conen (1957–59)
- (West Germany) Theo Kirchberg (1959–60)
- (West Germany) Erich Garske (1960–62)
- (West Germany) Fritz Pliska (1962–65)
- (West Germany) Theo Kirchberg (1965–71)
- (West Germany) Gero Bisanz (1971–73)
- (West Germany) Friedhelm Renno (1973–74)
- (West Germany) Manfred Rummel (1974–75)
- (Socialist Federal Republic of Yugoslavia) Radoslav Momirski (1976–76)
- (West Germany) Willibert Kremer (1 July 1976 – 22 November 1981)
- (West Germany) Gerhard Kentschke (23 November 1981 – 30 June 1982)
- (West Germany) Dettmar Cramer (1 July 1982 – 30 June 1985)
- (West Germany) / (Germany) Erich Ribbeck (1 July 1985 – 30 June 1988, 10 April 1995 – 27 April 1996)
- (Netherlands) Rinus Michels (1 July 1988 – 13 April 1989)
- (Germany) Jürgen Gelsdorf (13 April 1989 – 30 May 1991)
- (Germany) Peter Hermann (31 May 1991 – 30 June 1991)
- (Germany) Reinhard Saftig (1 July 1991 – 4 April 1993)
- (Serbia and Montenegro) Dragoslav Stepanović (4 April 1993 – 7 April 1995)
- (Germany) Peter Hermann (28 April 1996 – 30 June 1996)
- (Germany) Christoph Daum (1 July 1996 – 21 October 2000)
- (Germany) Rudi Völler (21 October 2000–11 November 2000, 16 September 2005 – 9 October 2005)
- (Germany) Berti Vogts (12 November 2000 – 20 May 2001)
- (Germany) Klaus Toppmöller (1 July 2001 – 15 February 2003)
- (Germany) Thomas Hörster (16 February 2003 – 10 May 2003)
- (Germany) Klaus Augenthaler (13 May 2003 – 16 September 2005)
- (Germany) Michael Skibbe (9 October 2005 – 21 May 2008)
- (Germany) Bruno Labbadia (1 July 2008 – 5 June 2009)
- (Germany) Jupp Heynckes (5 June 2009 – 1 July 2011)
- (Germany) Robin Dutt (1 July 2011 – 1 April 2012)
- (Finland) Sami Hyypiä (1 April 2012 – 5 April 2014)
- (Germany) Sascha Lewandowski (5 April 2014 – 1 July 2014)
- (Germany) Roger Schmidt (1 July 2014 – 5 March 2017)
- (Turkey) Tayfun Korkut (6 March 2017 – 30 June 2017)
- (Germany) Heiko Herrlich (1 July 2017 – 23 December 2018)
- (Netherlands) Peter Bosz (23 December 2018 – 23 March 2021)
- (Germany) Hannes Wolf (23 March 2021 – 30 June 2021)
- (Switzerland) Gerardo Seoane (1 July 2021 – 5 October 2022)
- (Spain) Xabi Alonso (5 October 2022 – 31 May 2025)
- (Netherlands) Erik ten Hag (1 July 2025 – 1 September 2025)
- (Denmark) Kasper Hjulmand (8 September 2025 – 4 June 2026)
- (Spain) Carles Martínez Novell (1 July 2026 – present)

== See also ==
- TSV Bayer 04 Leverkusen (handball)
- Bayer Giants Leverkusen (basketball)
- KFC Uerdingen 05
- Works team
- The Football Club Social Alliance
- Leverkusen
