= Isenburg, Rhineland-Palatinate =

Isenburg
- Municipality
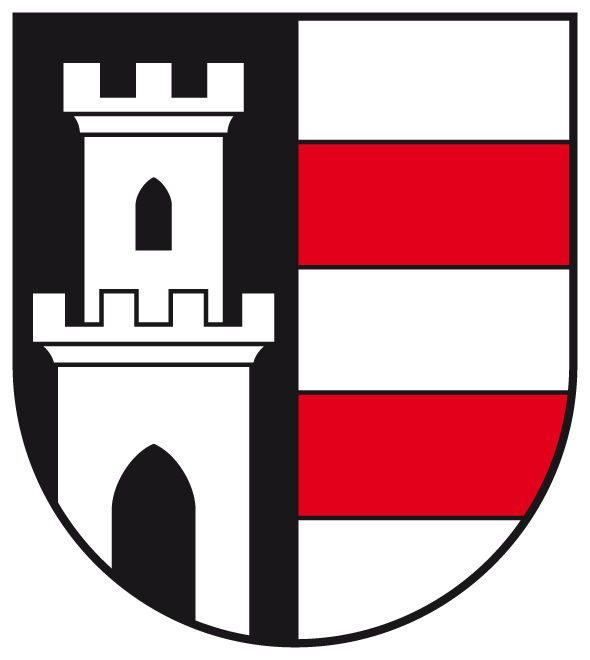
- Coat of arms

- Location of Isenburg within Neuwied district
- Interactive map of Isenburg
- Location within Germany Location within Rhineland-Palatinate
- Coordinates: 50°28′38″N 7°35′23″E
- Country: Germany
- State: Rhineland-Palatinate
- District: Neuwied
- Municipal assoc.: Dierdorf

Government
  - Mayor (2019–24): Detlef Mohr

Area
  - Total: 4.17 km^{2} (1.61 sq mi)
- Elevation: 160 m (520 ft)

Population (2025-12-31)
  - Total: 578
  - Density: 139/km^{2} (359/sq mi)
- Time zone: UTC+01:00 (CET)
  - Summer (DST): UTC+02:00 (CEST)
- Postal codes: 56271
- Dialling codes: 02601
- Vehicle registration: NR

Isenburg (German pronunciation: [ˈiːzn̩bʊʁk]) is a municipality in the district of Neuwied, in Rhineland-Palatinate, Germany.

The castle was built by the Counts of Isenburg around 1100 if not prior. Occupied by several branches of the Isenburg family (as a Ganerbenburg), it was inhabited into the early 17th century. Shortly after being abandoned, it became a ruin. After the branch of Lower Isenburg had extinguished in 1664 with count Ernst of Isenburg-Grenzau, the county was partitioned between the counts of Walderdorff and the counts of Wied-Neuwied. The present owner of the castle is Maximilian, 9th Prince of Wied, son of Carl, 8th Prince of Wied and Princess Isabelle of Isenburg.
