= Hermann Saue =

Norwegian politician (born 1939)

Hermann Saue (born 3 April 1939) is a Norwegian politician for the Conservative Party.

He served as a deputy representative to the Parliament of Norway from Hordaland during the terms 1977–1981, 1981–1985 and 1985–1989. In total he met during 1 day of parliamentary session.
