= Kleinmaischeid =

- Municipality
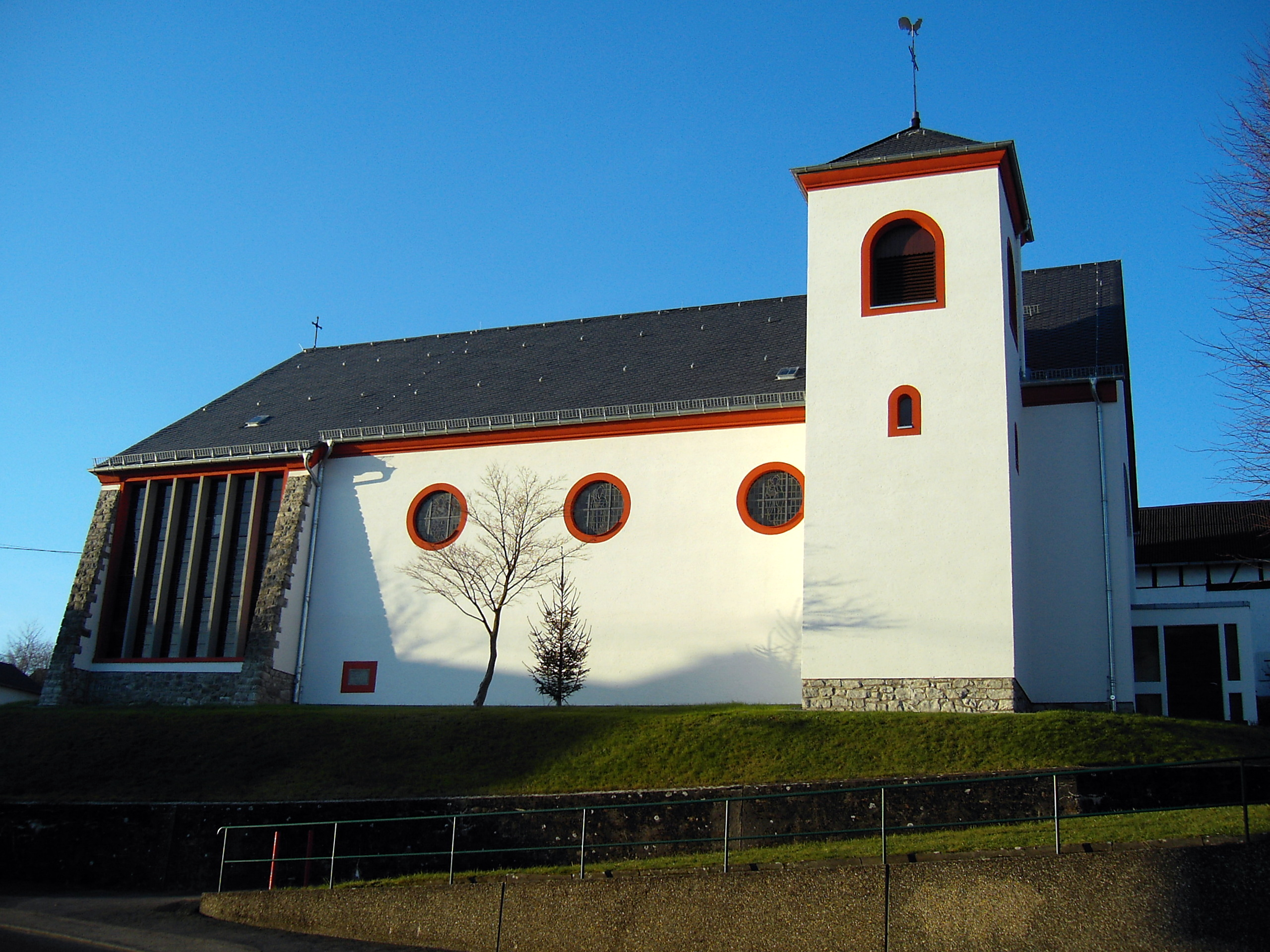
- Church

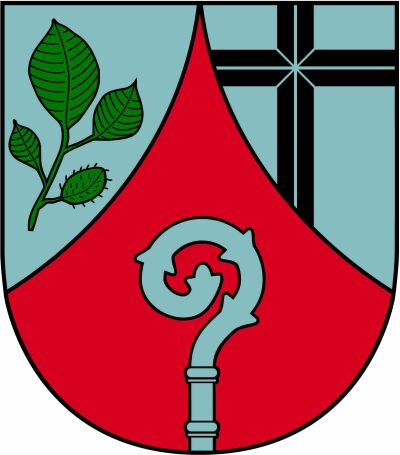
- Coat of arms

- Location of Kleinmaischeid within Neuwied district
- Interactive map of Kleinmaischeid
- Location within Germany Location within Rhineland-Palatinate
- Coordinates: 50°30′42″N 7°36′40″E
- Country: Germany
- State: Rhineland-Palatinate
- District: Neuwied
- Municipal assoc.: Dierdorf

Government
  - Mayor (2019–24): Philipp Rasbach (SPD)

Area
  - Total: 6.99 km^{2} (2.70 sq mi)
- Elevation: 285 m (935 ft)

Population (2025-12-31)
  - Total: 1,351
  - Density: 193/km^{2} (501/sq mi)
- Time zone: UTC+01:00 (CET)
  - Summer (DST): UTC+02:00 (CEST)
- Postal codes: 56271
- Dialling codes: 02689
- Vehicle registration: NR
- Website: www.kleinmaischeid.de

Kleinmaischeid is a municipality in the district of Neuwied, in Rhineland-Palatinate, Germany.

Between 1 May 2004 and 31 December 2006, it was the centre point of the European Union. South of Kleinmaischeid lies Großmaischeid.

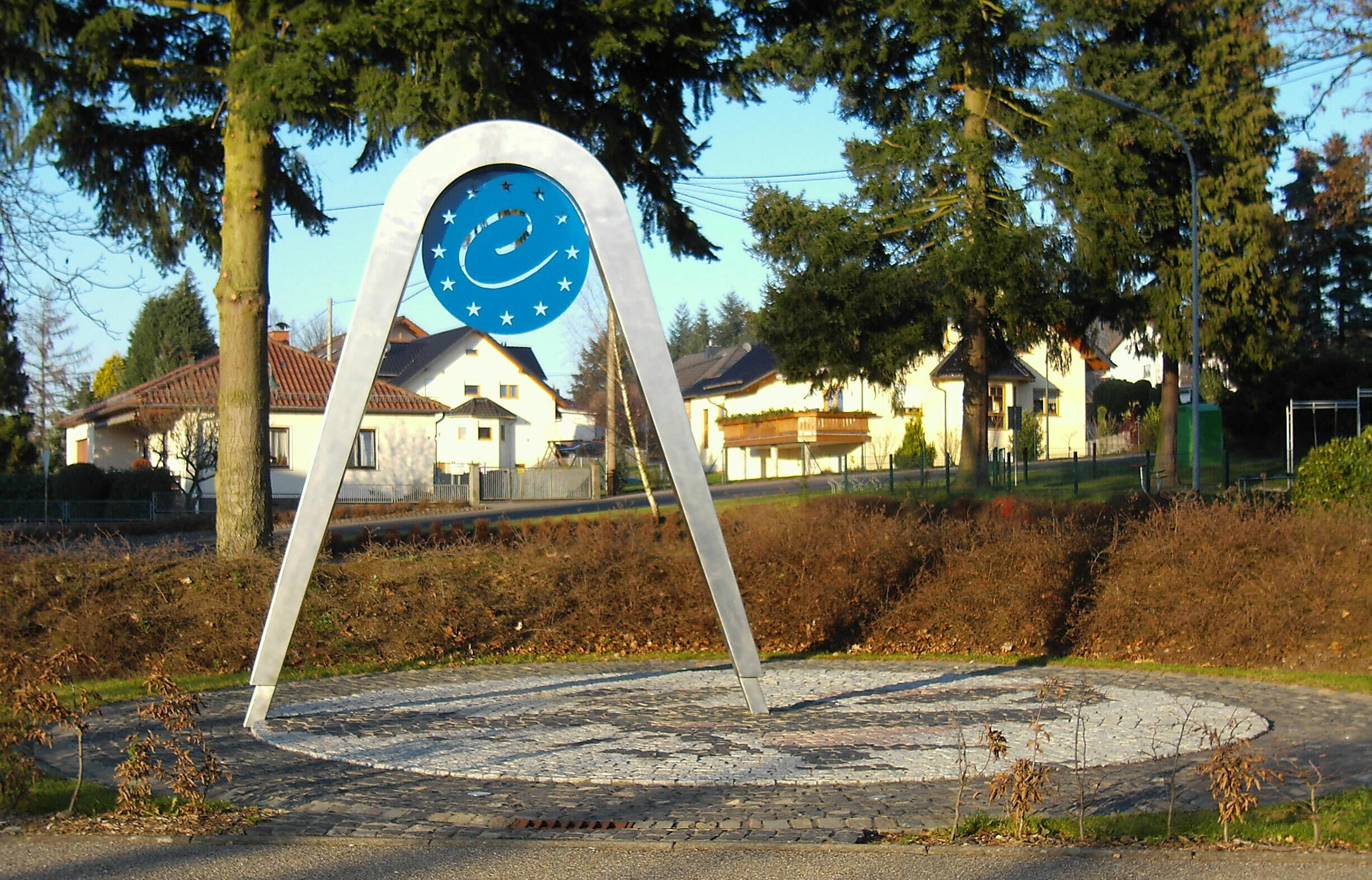
Memorial Zirkelschlag, representing the geographical center of the European Union.
