= Manfred Werz =

German civil engineer (1933–2021)

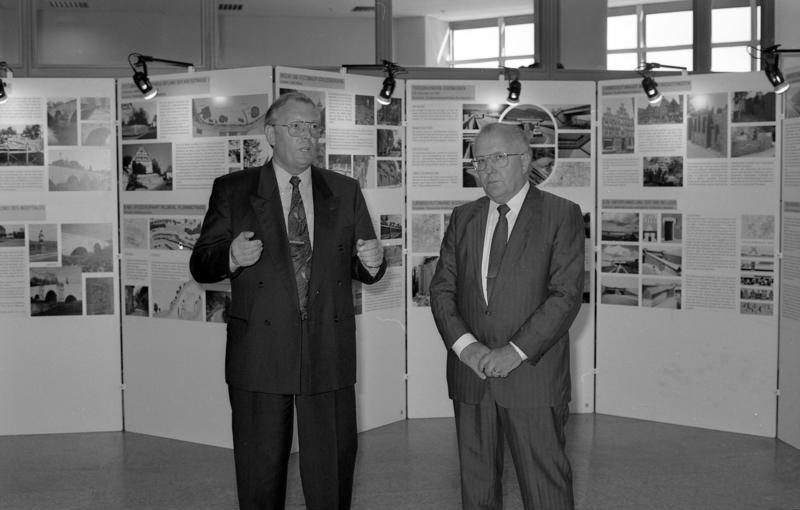
- Manfred Werz, openoing the exhibitions "Ways to More Road Safety" and "Engineering Structures in Road Construction" at the Federal Ministry of Transport.
- Born: 15 May 1933; Dierdorf, Germany
- Died: 7 April 2021 (aged 87)
- Engineering career
- Discipline: Civil engineering

Manfred Werz (15 May 1933 – 7 April 2021) was a German civil engineer and a president of the Federal Association of Road and Traffic Engineers (Bundesvereinigung der Straßenbau- und Verkehrsingenieure) from 1990 to 1993 and Road Administration Rheinland-Pfalz (Straßenverwaltung Rheinland-Pfalz) (now known as Landesbetrieb Mobilität Rheinland-Pfalz) from 1995 to 1998 in Germany. In 1998, he earned the Wirtschaftsmedaille des Landes Rheinland-Pfalz, a prestigious award and acknowledgement for his work, handed by Rainer Brüderle, Minister of Economics and Transport of Rhineland-Palatinate at the time. Werz died on 7 April 2021, at the age of 87.
