= Philip Lorenz International Keyboard Concerts =

Philip Lorenz International Keyboard Concerts or Philip Lorenz Memorial Keyboard Concerts is an international keyboard concert series in Central California that was founded in 1972 (with the name Keyboard Concerts) by Philip Lorenz. In 1992, upon the passing of Philip Lorenz, president and artistic director, Andreas Werz was appointed by the Board as his successor. Noteworthy artists who have been part of the series include Emanuel Ax, Sergei Babayan, Barry Douglas, Richard Goode, Radu Lupu, Paul Badura-Skoda, Ruth Laredo, Tigran Hamasyan, Angela Hewitt, Garrick Ohlsson, Philippe Entremont and Yefim Bronfman.
