= Hermann Fressant =

14th-century German town clerk

Hermann Fressant was a 14th-century town clerk in the German city of Ulm. He was probably born in Augsburg. His claim to fame is the late Middle High German verse tale of marital fidelity, Der Hellerwertwitz (A Ha'porth of Good Sense). A philandering merchant is advised to pretend that he has become a pauper. He finds that his golddigging mistresses abandon him; in contrast, his loyal wife comforts him.
