= Andreas Werz =

Concert pianist and music professor

Andreas Werz (born in Frankfurt, Germany in 1960) is an international concert pianist, music professor at California State University, Fresno, and has been the artistic director of the Philip Lorenz International Keyboard Concerts, a Central California concert series known for presenting internationally recognized pianists such as Emanuel Ax, Sergei Babayan, Barry Douglas, and Angela Hewitt, since 1992.
