= Julian Herrmann =

German politician (born 1995)

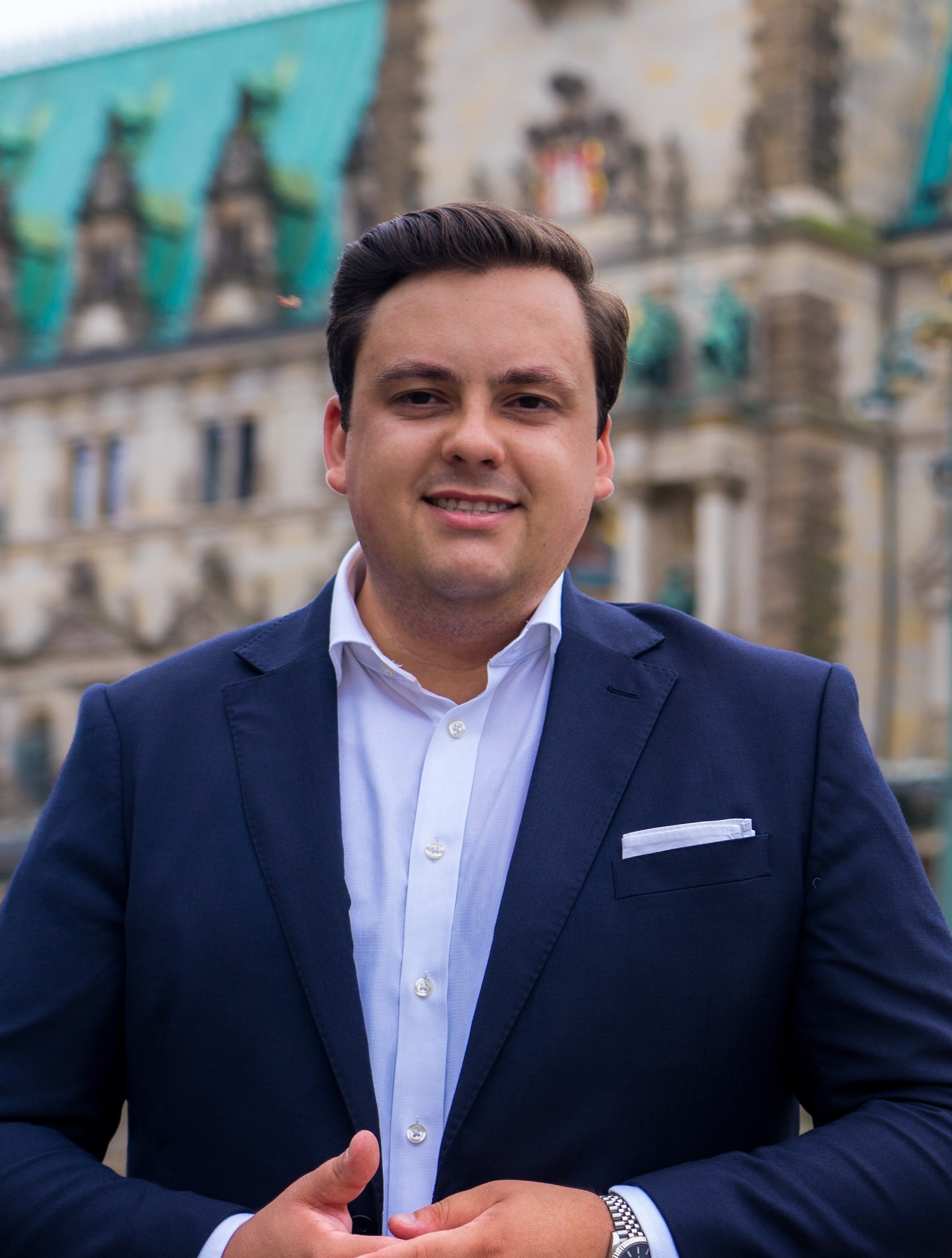
- Herrmann in 2024

Member of the Hamburg Parliament
- Incumbent
- Assumed office 26 March 2025

Personal details
- Born: 2 August 1995 (age 30)
- Party: Christian Democratic Union (since 2017)

Julian Herrmann (born 2 August 1995) is a German politician serving as a member of the Hamburg Parliament since 2025. He is a board member of the Young Union.
