= Franz Ludwig Hermann =

German painter (1723–1791)

Franz Ludwig Hermann (7 January 1723, in Ettal – 25 July 1791, in Konstanz) was a German painter of frescos, best remembered for his paintings and altarpieces that are at Ittingen Charterhouse, Kreuzlingen Abbey, and St. Ulrich's Priory in the Black Forest.
