= Peter Hermann (footballer) =

German football player and coach (1952–2026)

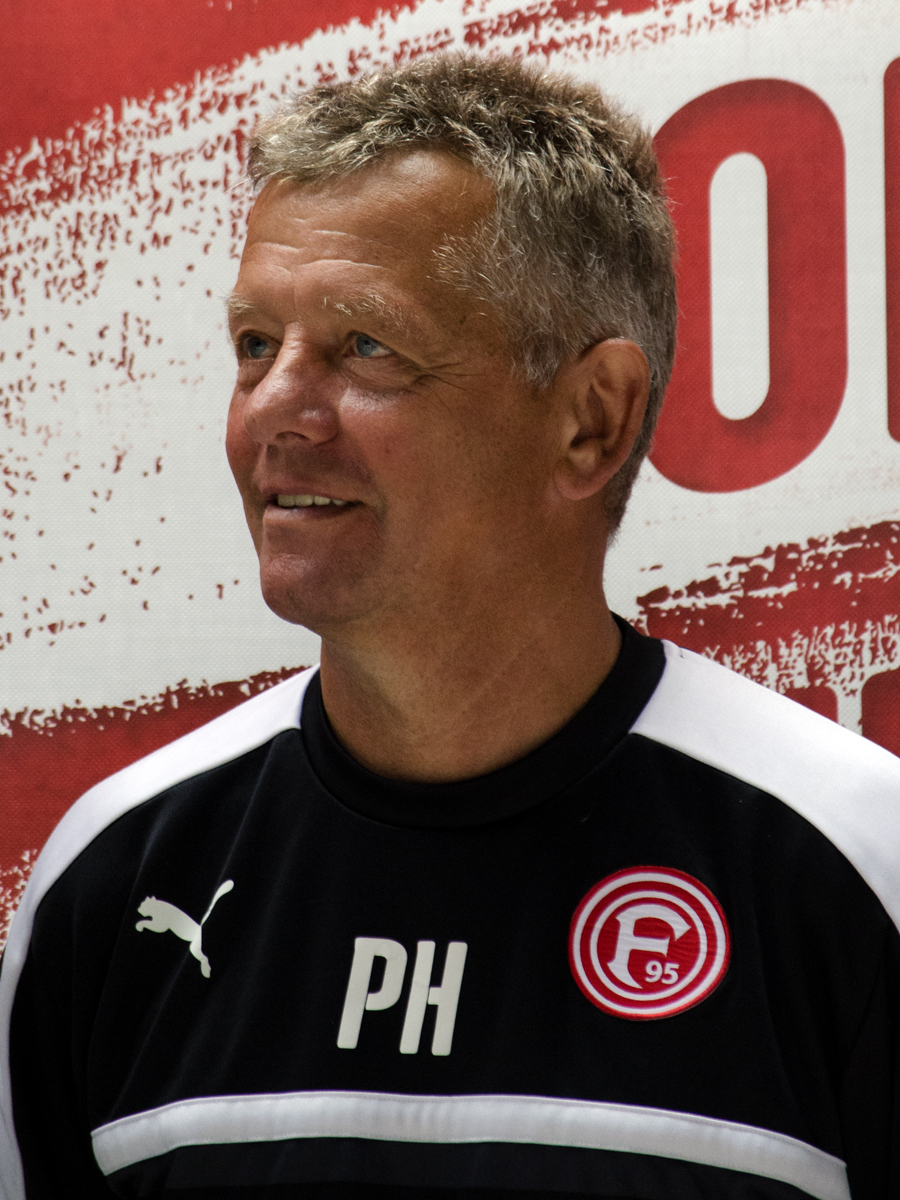
- Hermann with Fortuna Düsseldorf in 2016

Personal information
- Full name: Franz-Peter Hermann
- Date of birth: 22 March 1952
- Place of birth: Kleinmaischeid, West Germany
- Date of death: 19 September 2026 (aged 74)
- Height: 1.74 m (5 ft 9 in)
- Position: Forward

Senior career*
Years	Team	Apps	(Gls)
1970–1972	FV Engers		
1972–1973	TuS Neuendorf		
1973	Hamburger SV	2	(0)
1973–1974	TuS Neuendorf		
1974–1976	Alemannia Aachen	69	(7)
1976–1984	Bayer Leverkusen	215	(32)
1984–1987	VfL Hamm/Sieg		

Managerial career
- 1989–2008: Bayer Leverkusen (assistant)
- 1991: Bayer Leverkusen (interim)
- 1996: Bayer Leverkusen (interim)
- 2003: Bayer Leverkusen II
- 2008–2009: 1. FC Nürnberg (assistant)
- 2009–2011: Bayer Leverkusen (assistant)
- 2011–2013: Bayern Munich (assistant)
- 2013–2014: Schalke 04 (assistant)
- 2015: Hamburger SV (assistant)
- 2015: Fortuna Düsseldorf (assistant)
- 2015: Fortuna Düsseldorf
- 2017–2019: Bayern Munich (assistant)
- 2021: Bayer Leverkusen (assistant)
- 2022: Schalke 04 (assistant)
- 2022: Borussia Dortmund (assistant)
- * Club domestic league appearances and goals

Franz-Peter Hermann (22 March 1952 – 19 September 2026) was a German football player and coach.

== Managerial career ==
Hermann took over Bayer Leverkusen from 1 June 1991 to 30 June 1991, 8 April 1995 to 10 April 1995, and 28 April 1996 to 30 June 1996. In his first stint as manager, he got a win and a loss in two matches. In his second stint, he won his only match in–charge. In his final stint, he won one match, drew one match, and lost three. He managed Bayer Leverkusen II from 17 February 2003 to 14 May 2003. He failed to win any of his matches as head coach. On 24 November 2015, Hermann became the interim manager of Fortuna Düsseldorf. On 6 October, Hermann became co-assistant manager at FC Bayern Munich under Jupp Heynckes, following the dismissal of Carlo Ancelotti. After the retirement of Jupp Heynckes, Hermann also followed the same footstep at the end of the season.

On 2 July 2018, Bayern's new head coach Niko Kovač announced that Hermann would remain as the assistant coach of the club and would join the coaching staff from 1 September.

== Death ==
Herrmann died from amyotrophic lateral sclerosis on 19 September 2026, at the age of 74.

== Managerial record ==
Team	From	To	Record					Ref.
Team	From	To	G	W	D	L	Win %	Ref.
Bayer Leverkusen	1 June 1991	30 June 1991	2	1	0	1	50.00	
Bayer Leverkusen	8 April 1995	10 April 1995	1	1	0	0	100.00	
Bayer Leverkusen	28 April 1996	30 June 1996	5	1	1	3	20.00	
Bayer Leverkusen II	17 February 2003	14 May 2003	10	0	2	8	0.00	
Fortuna Düsseldorf	24 November 2015	Present	0	0	0	0	—	
Total			18	3	3	12	16.67	—

== Honours ==
- DFB-Pokal finalist: 1973–74
