= Luke Herrmann =

British art historian

Luke Herrmann

Luke John Herrmann (born Lutz Johann Wolfgang Maximilian Hermann; 9 March 1932 – 9 September 2016) was a British art historian who was an expert on the art of J. M. W. Turner.

== Early life ==
Herrmann was born on 9 March 1932 in Berlin into a German Jewish family. He was educated in England at Westminster School and at the University of Oxford.

== Career ==
Herrmann briefly worked at the Illustrated London News. While there, he got to know editor Bruce Ingram, who was a prominent art collector and under whose guidance he began to collect English watercolour paintings in the 1950s. After Ingram's death in 1963, Herrmann inherited over 30 pictures from him, which he donated to a selection of British art galleries in 2002. He later worked at the Ashmolean Museum.

== Personal life ==
In 1965, Herrmann married Georgina (née Thompson); she would go on to become a notable archaeologist of Western Asia. Together they had two sons.

Herrmann died on 9 September 2016.

== Selected publications ==
- Ruskin and Turner: A study of Ruskin as a collector of Turner, based on his gifts to the University of Oxford; incorporating a catalogue raisonné of the Turner drawings in the Ashmolean Museum. F.A. Praeger, New York, 1969.
- British landscape painting of the eighteenth century. Faber & Faber, London, 1973. ISBN 9780571093946
- Turner: Paintings, watercolours, prints, and drawings. Phaidon Press, London, 1975. ISBN 9780714816661
- Paul and Thomas Sandby. B.T. Batsford in association with the Victoria & Albert Museum, London, 1986. ISBN 978-0713447880
- Turner prints: The engraved work of J.M.W. Turner. Phaidon Press, 1994. ISBN 978-0714825533
- Nineteenth century British painting. Giles de la Mare, London, 2000. ISBN 9781900357173
- J.M.W. Turner. Oxford University Press, Oxford, 2007. (Very Interesting People series) ISBN 978-0199217557
