= Hermann Müller =

Hermann Müller may refer to:

- Hermann Müller (German botanist) (1829–1883), German botanist with whom Darwin corresponded
- Hermann Müller (Swiss botanist) (1850–1927), Swiss botanist
- Hermann Müller (cyclist) (1911–?), German cyclist
- Hermann Müller (politician, born 1876) (1876–1931), German Social Democratic politician and twice chancellor of Germany
- Hermann Müller (politician, born 1935) (1935–2013), German politician, mayor of Idstein
- Hermann Müller (racewalker) (1885–1947), German race walker
- Hermann Joseph Muller (1890–1967), American geneticist and educator, Nobel laureate in Physiology and Medicine
- Paul Hermann Müller (1899–1965), Swiss chemist, Nobel laureate in Physiology and Medicine
- Hermann Paul Müller (1909–1975), German motorcycle and auto racer driver
- Herman Carl Mueller (1854–1941), German-born American ceramicist
