= Georgina Herrmann =

British archaeologist and academic

Georgina Herrmann OBE FSA FBA
- Born: Herrmann Thompson; 20 October 1937 (age 88)
- Spouse: Luke Herrmann (m. 1965; died 2016)
- Children: 2

Academic background
- Education: Institute of Archaeology, University of London; St Hugh's College, Oxford

Academic work
- Discipline: Archaeology
- Sub-discipline: Western Asia; Mesopotamia; Lapis lazuli; Sasanian Empire; Nimrud ivories; Merv
- Institutions: University of Oxford; University of Cambridge; Institute of Archaeology, University of London; University College London

Georgina Herrmann, OBE, FSA, FBA (born 20 October 1937) is a British retired archaeologist and academic, specialising in Near Eastern archaeology. Having worked as a civil servant, she later studied archaeology and spent the rest of her career as an active field archaeologist and lecturer. She was Reader in the Archaeology of Western Asia at University College London from 1994 to 2002.

== Early life and education ==
Herrmann was born on 20 October 1937 to John and Gladys Thompson. He first career was as a secretary in the Foreign Office from 1956 to 1961. She then returned to education, and studied for a postgraduate diploma at the Institute of Archaeology, University of London, which she completed in 1963. She then undertook research at St Hugh's College, Oxford, graduating with a Doctor of Philosophy (DPhil) degree in 1966. Her doctoral thesis was titled "The source, distribution, history and use of Lapis Lazuli in western Asia from the earliest times to the end of the Seleucid era": this was the first extensive study of the Lapis Lazuli trade originating in Afghanistan. Her doctoral supervisor was Max Mallowan.

== Academic career ==
Herrmann began her academic career as J. R. MacIver Junior Research Fellow at the University of Oxford from 1966 to 1968. She was Calouste Gulbenkian Fellow at the University of Cambridge from 1974 to 1976. She was Regents' Professor at University of California at Berkeley in 1986. From 1985 to 1991, she held a Leverhulme Research Fellowship and was a part-time lecturer at the Institute of Archaeology, University of London. With the Institute merging into University College London (UCL) in 1986, she was a lecturer in Mesopotamian archaeology at UCL from 1991 to 1993 and Reader in the Archaeology of Western Asia from 1993 until she retired in 2002.

Herrmann's early research interests included Sasanian rock reliefs in Iran, the third millennium BCE lapis lazuli trade from Afghanistan, and the Nimrud ivories. In 1992, she became director of the excavations at Merv, a Silk Road oasis site in Turkmenistan. She played a key role in the successful application for Merv to become the first UNESCO World Heritage Site in Central Asia, which was granted in 1999.

In retirement, she was a visiting honorary research professor between 2002 and 2020, and she has been emeritus reader since 2020. She was a member of council of the British Academy between 2012 and 2015.

In 2022, her colleagues and students contributed to a festschrift in her honour: Ivories, Rock Reliefs and Merv. Studies on the Ancient Near East in Honour of Georgina Herrmann, edited by Dirk Wicke and John Curtis, Marru 15 (Münster: Zaphon), 2022. [ISBN 9783963272080] [OCLC 1351779706]

== Personal life ==
In 1965, Georgina Thompson married Luke John Herrmann, a German-born British art historian. Together they had two sons. Her husband predeceased her, dying in 2016.

== Honours ==
On 4 January 1968, Herrmann was elected a Fellow of the Society of Antiquaries of London (FSA). In 1996, she was awarded the Rolex Award for Enterprise in Cultural Heritage for her work leading the excavation at Merv. In 1997, she was elected an honorary foreign member of the American Institute of Archaeology. In 1999, she was elected a Fellow of the British Academy (FBA), the United Kingdom's national academy for the humanities and social sciences. In 2001, she was appointed an Officer of the Order of the British Empire (OBE).

== Selected works ==
- Herrmann, Georgina (1977). The Iranian revival. Oxford: Elsevier-Phaidon. ISBN 978-0729000451.
- Herrmann, Georgina (1986). Ivories from room SW 37, Fort Shalmaneser. London: British School of Archaeology in Iraq. ISBN 978-0903472104.
- Herrmann, Georgina (1999). Monuments of Merv: traditional buildings of the Karakum. London: Society of Antiquaries of London. ISBN 978-0854312757.
- Cribb, Joe; Herrmann, Georgina, eds. (2007). After Alexander: Central Asia before Islam. Oxford: Oxford University Press. ISBN 978-0197263846.
- Herrmann, Georgina (2017). Ancient Ivory: Masterpieces of the Assyrian Empire. London: Thames and Hudson. ISBN 978-0500051917.
