= Joannes Hermans =

Flemish still life and animal painter

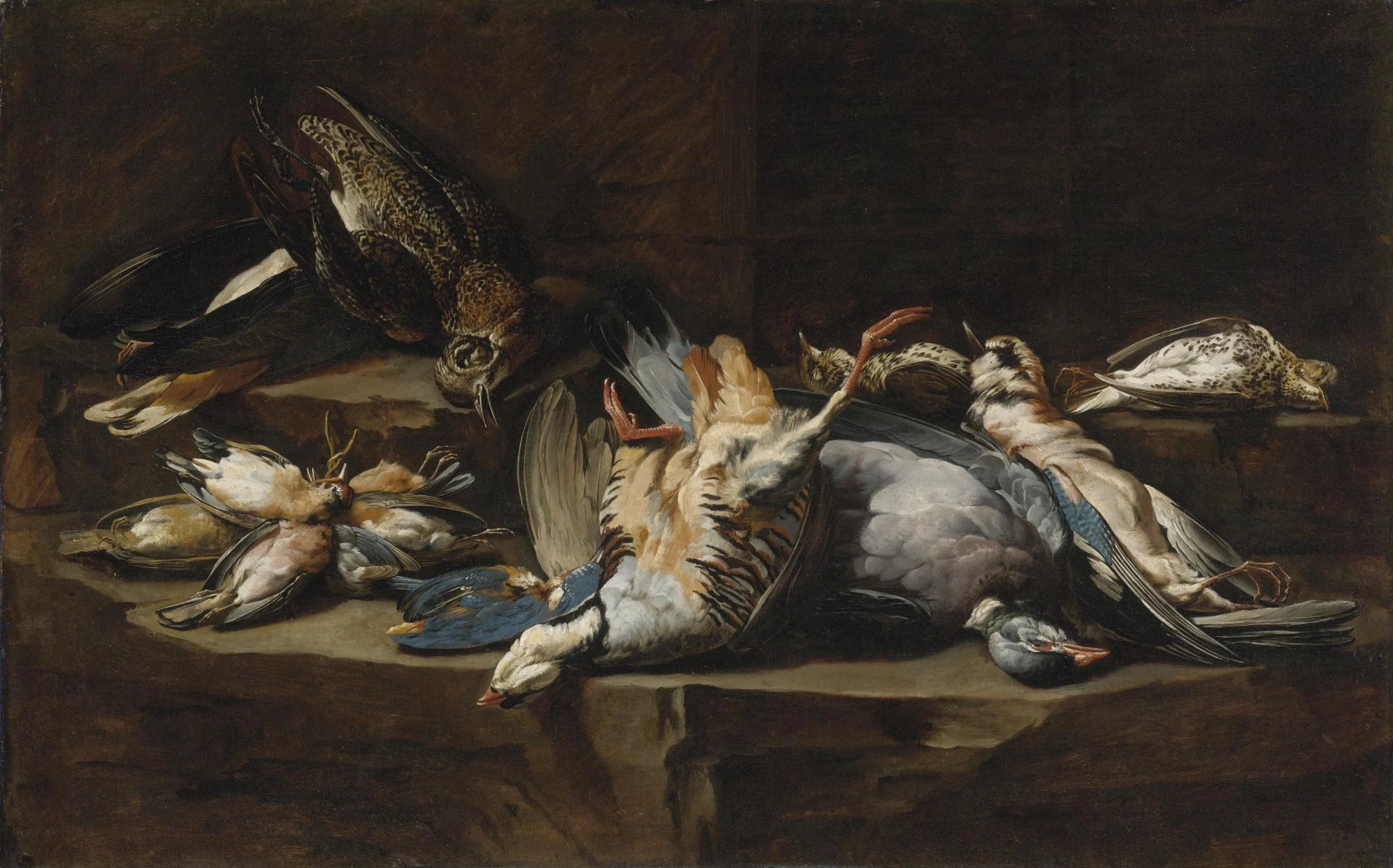
Still life of game birds resting on a rock ledge

Joannes Hermans, called Monsú Aurora, (Antwerp, c. 1630 – c. 1677) was a Flemish painter of animals and still lifes of game, fruit and flowers who worked in Italy and Antwerp where he contributed to the development of the Baroque still life genre.

== Life ==
Details about the life of Joannes Hermans are scarce. He is believed that he was born in Antwerp. Here is registered as a pupil of the obscure painter Adriaen Willenhoudt from 1644. He is assumed to have worked in the Antwerp workshop of the prominent still life and animal painter Jan Fijt as Hermans' hand has been identified in a collaborative painting of Fijt.

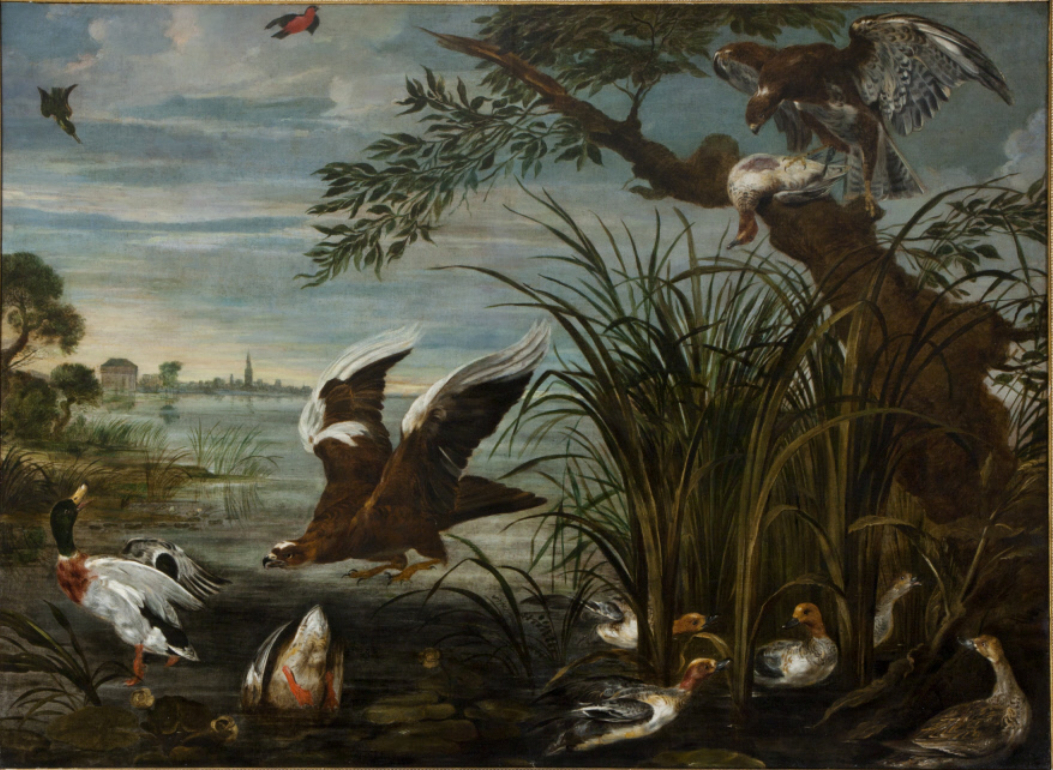
River scene with ducks and geese being attacked by hawks

He travelled to Italy where he was recorded in Rome in the period from 1657 to 1665 and was known as 'Monsú Aurora'. He enjoyed high-level patronage in Rome as is demonstrated by the commission to decorate the Roman palace of the nobleman Camillo Pamphili in 1656. Camillo Pamphili was an avid hunter and lover of hunting-themed artworks. For the commission, Hermans painted a large canvas and 38 smaller compositions depicting both dead and living animals, some set in marshy landscapes. These formed part of a set of about 50 paintings with this theme, that Pamphili had commissioned, for educational as well as decorative purposes. Hermans received 26 weekly payments for executing the commission.

Hermans also enjoyed the patronage of the Corsini, Colonna and Imperiali families as is shown by the presence of his works in contemporary Roman inventories. His compositions were also admired by the Flemish animalier David de Coninck and the Italian still life painter Pietro Navarra, both of whom worked in Rome during the second half of the 17th century.

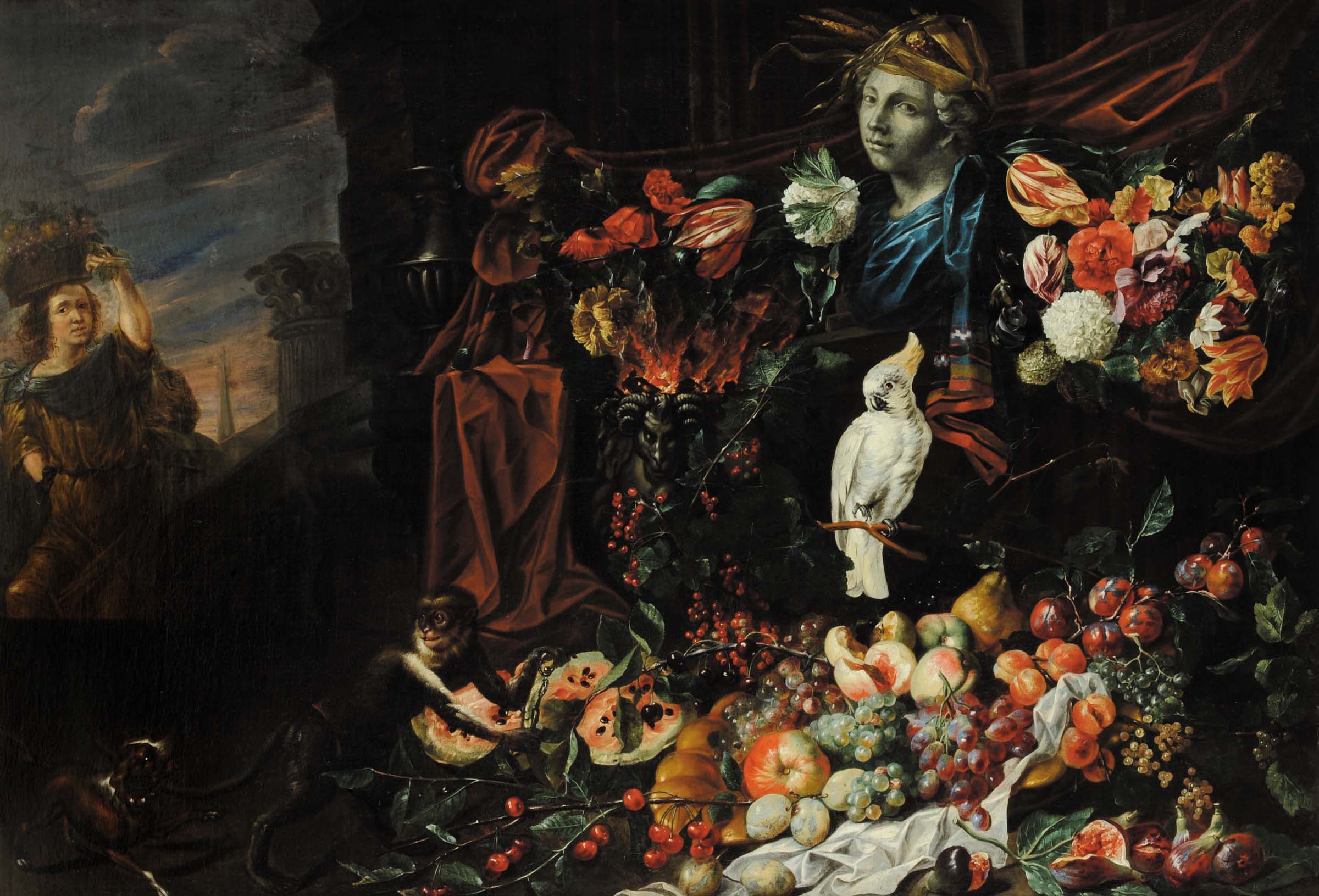
Still life around a bust of Ceres

He returned to Antwerp in 1665 and became a master of the local Guild of Saint Luke. It is not clear when or where he died but it was likely in or after 1665 and before 1687.

== Work ==
Joannes Hermans painted animals, game pieces and still lifes of flowers and fruit. From his Antwerp period only one signed painting is known.

It is only through the research of Eduard A. Safarik and other scholars in the 1970s that the artist known in Italy as 'Monsù Aurora' was identified with Joannes Hermans. Their conclusions were confirmed by the presence of the monogram "JHF" (Joannes Hermans Fecit) on one of the paintings in the Pamphili Palace attributed to Monsù Aurora. Through the attribution of further works to him, his stature among 17th century still life painters has steadily risen.

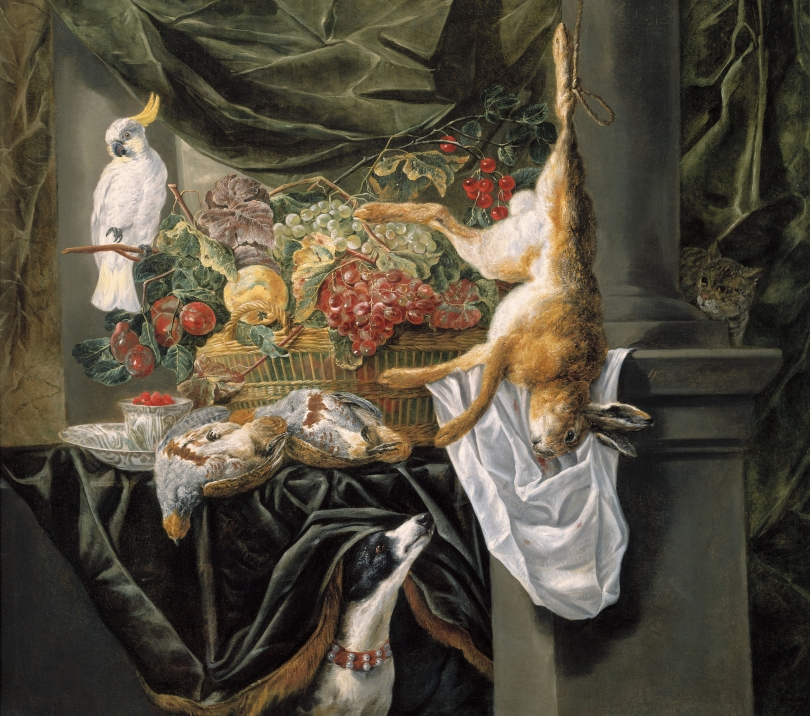
Still Life with Fruit, Hunting Trophies, a Parrot, a Cat and a Dog

His grandiose still lifes combining human figures, flowers and fruit anticipate the arrival in Rome in 1653 of Abraham Brueghel who created large-scale Baroque compositions of flowers, fruit and animals. An example of such a large-scale composition by Hermans is the Still life around a bust of Ceres of 1653 (Sold at Cambi Casa d'Aste on 15 March 2011 in Genoa, lot 1452). These compositions with their cool, distanced objectivity celebrate the colourful hues of the birds' feathers, creating a "surreal" ambiance. In this compositions Hermans reveals the debt he owed to the works of the leading Flemish animal and game piece painter Jan Fyt. The series of bird etchings by Pieter Boel, another Flemish animal painter who stayed in Rome prior to 1650 also appear to have been an inspiration for his work. He must also have known the work of Nicasius Bernaerts, known in Italy under the pseudonym Monsù Nicasio.

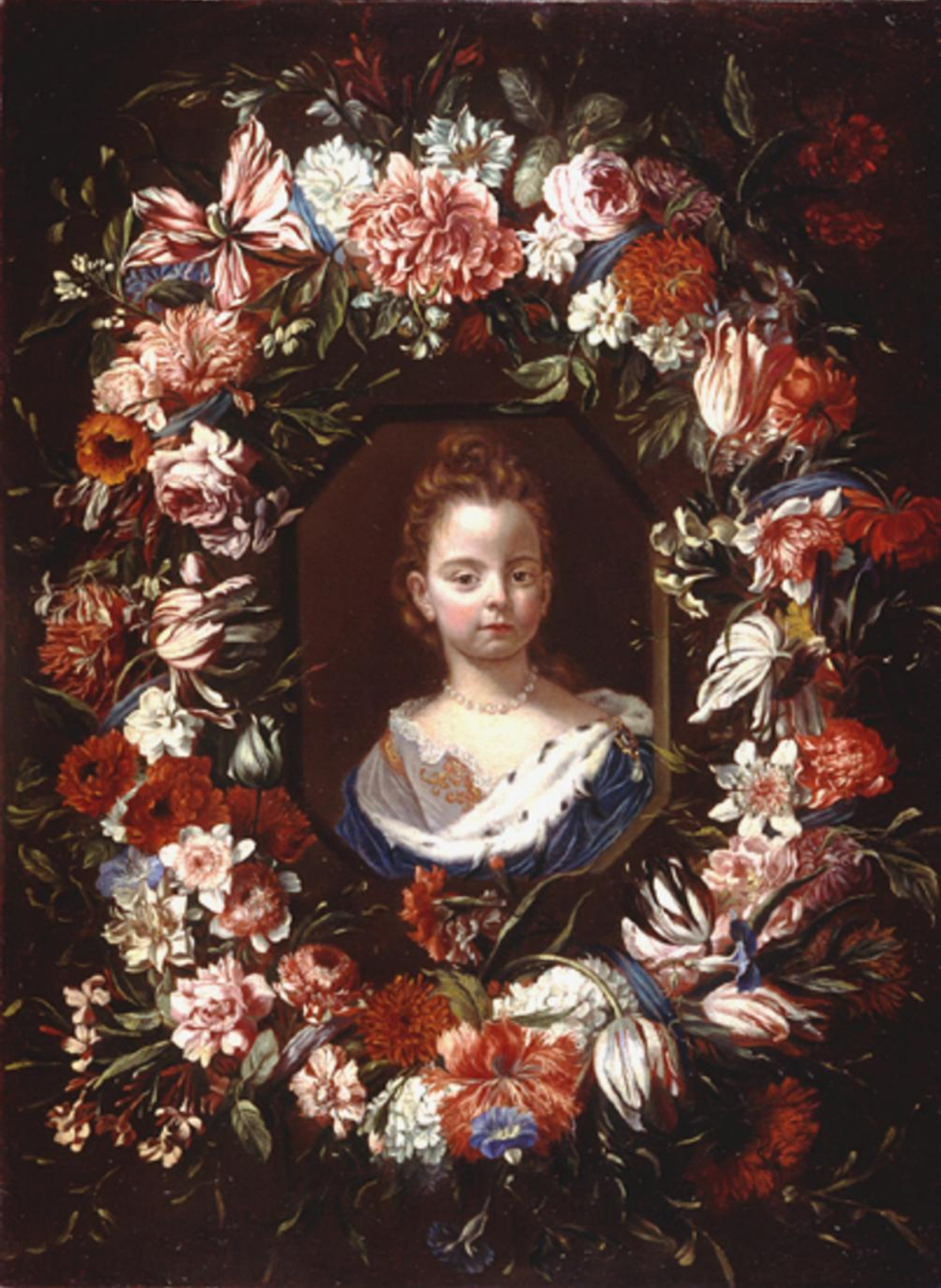
Portrait of a young girl in a garland

Hermans also created garland paintings. Garland paintings are a special type of still life developed in Antwerp by artists such as Jan Brueghel the Elder, Hendrick van Balen, Frans Francken the Younger, Peter Paul Rubens and Daniel Seghers. They typically show a flower garland around a devotional image or portrait. Garland paintings were usually collaborations between a still life and a figure painter. Two garland paintings by Hermans, depicting flower garlands around respectively a boy and a girl, are in private collections.

Hermans is known to have collaborated with other artists. A Still Life with Fruit, Hunting Trophies, a Parrot, a Cat and a Dog is a collaboration with the Flemish animalier Jan Fyt. In this painting each artist was responsible for different parts. The overall composition was done by Fijt, who also painted key parts of the composition, such as the dead hare, the partridges and the dog. The finishing of the painting was left to a studio assistant. While the assistant usually remained anonymous, in this composition he has been identified as Joannes Hermans. In Hermans' signed and dated Still life around a bust of Ceres from 1653 the same tufted parrot can be seen while the fruit is also rendered in an almost identical manner.
