= Mirko Hermann =

- Mirko Hermann with his family.
- Born: Mirko Emerich Hermann; 5 August 1868; Osijek, Austro-Hungarian monarchy, (now Croatia)
- Died: 2 April 1927 (aged 58); Zagreb, Kingdom of Yugoslavia, (now Croatia)
- Occupations: Industrialist, businessman

Mirko Hermann (5 August 1868 – 2 April 1927) was a Croatian industrialist, businessman and member of the Freemasonry in Osijek, Croatia.

Hermann was born in Osijek on 5 August 1868. He was raised in a Croatian-Jewish family of David Hermann. Hermann finished elementary and high school in Osijek. He attended and graduated from the University of Veterinary Medicine Vienna and University of University of Natural Resources and Life Sciences, Vienna. For a short period of time, after graduation, Hermann worked in Lika and later moved to Čepin near Osijek. In 1897 Hermann acquired on lease the agricultural estate "Mihajlović". He was also a renowned art collector and a longtime member of the "First Croatian-Slavonian traded company for the sugar industry" in Osijek. Hermann was one of the key renovators of Masonic activity in Osijek. From 1903 he was a member of the Freemasonry lodge "Ljubav bližnjega" (The Neighbour's Love) and from 1912 founder and Worshipful Master of the lodge "Budnost" (Vigilance). Due to disagreements with some members and the internal conflicts in the lodge, caused by new political circumstances after the World War I, Hermann retired from a place of Worshipful Master and left the lodge in 1923. Hermann was legal guardian of Terezija Svećenski, mother of Louis Svećenski, until her death. He died in Zagreb on 2 April 1927 and was buried at the Mirogoj Cemetery.

== Works ==
- O gospodarskoj snazi Jugoslavije (1918), Hrvatski štamparski zavod d. d. podružnica Osijek

== Bibliography ==
- Živaković-Kerže, Zlata (2005). Židovi u Osijeku (1918.-1941.). Osijek: Židovska općina Osijek – Tiskara Pauk d.o.o., Cerna. ISBN 953-6659-22-0.
