= Hermann Goetz (disambiguation) =

Hermann Goetz (1840–1876) was a German composer.

Hermann Goetz may also refer to:

- Hermann Goetz (art historian) (1898–1976), German art historian
- Hermann Görtz (1890–1947), German spy
- Hermann Götz (politician) (1914–1987), German politician
