= Marienhausen =

- Municipality
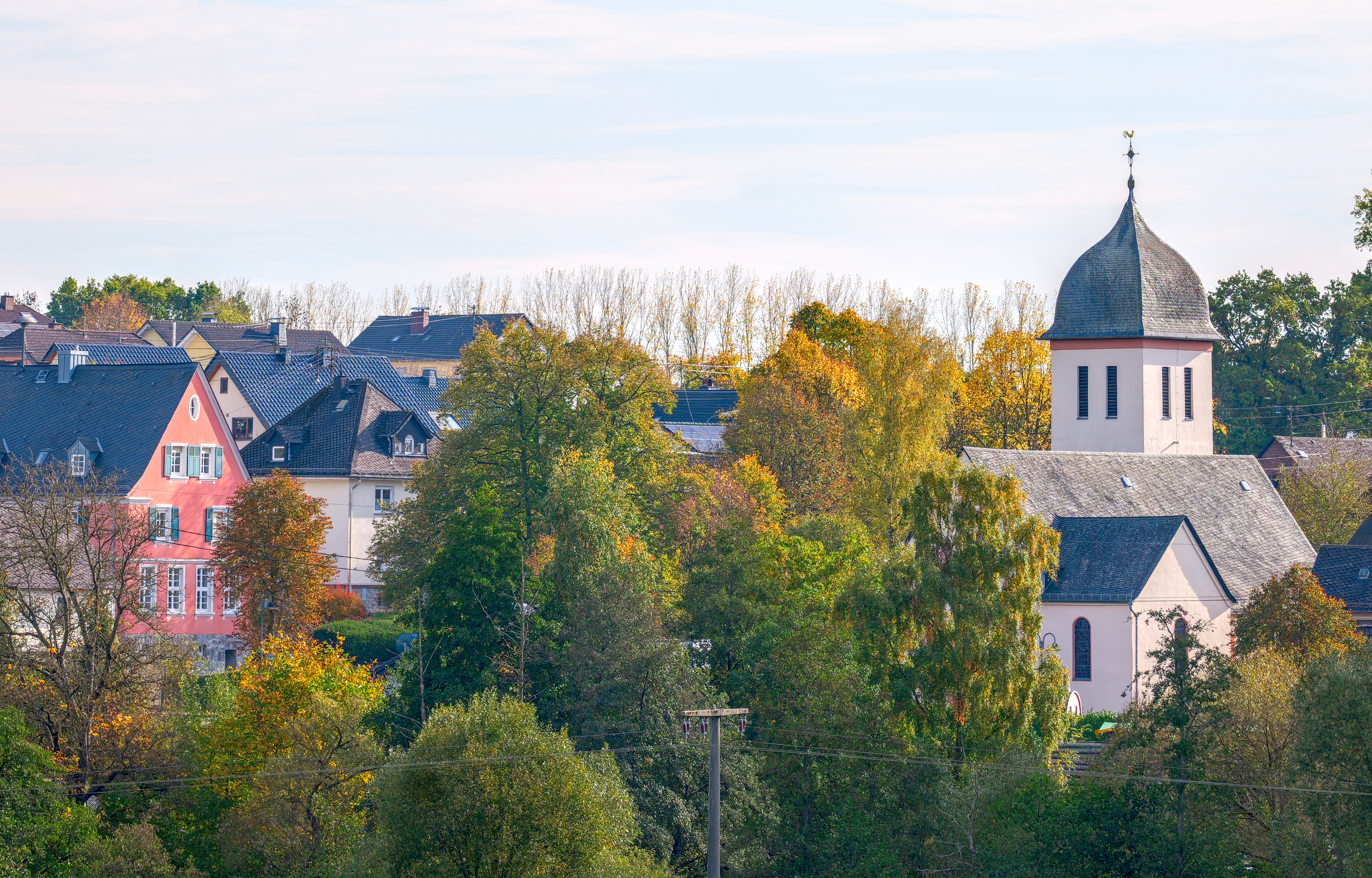

- Coat of arms

- Location of Marienhausen within Neuwied district
- Interactive map of Marienhausen
- Location within Germany Location within Rhineland-Palatinate
- Coordinates: 50°33′50″N 07°41′34″E
- Country: Germany
- State: Rhineland-Palatinate
- District: Neuwied
- Municipal assoc.: Dierdorf

Government
  - Mayor (2019–24): Maximilian Seidel

Area
  - Total: 4.84 km^{2} (1.87 sq mi)
- Elevation: 270 m (890 ft)

Population (2025-12-31)
  - Total: 462
  - Density: 95.5/km^{2} (247/sq mi)
- Time zone: UTC+01:00 (CET)
  - Summer (DST): UTC+02:00 (CEST)
- Postal codes: 56269
- Dialling codes: 02689
- Vehicle registration: NR
- Website: www.marienhausen.de

Marienhausen is a municipality in the district of Neuwied, in Rhineland-Palatinate, Germany.
