= Hans Herrmann (painter) =

German painter (1858–1942)

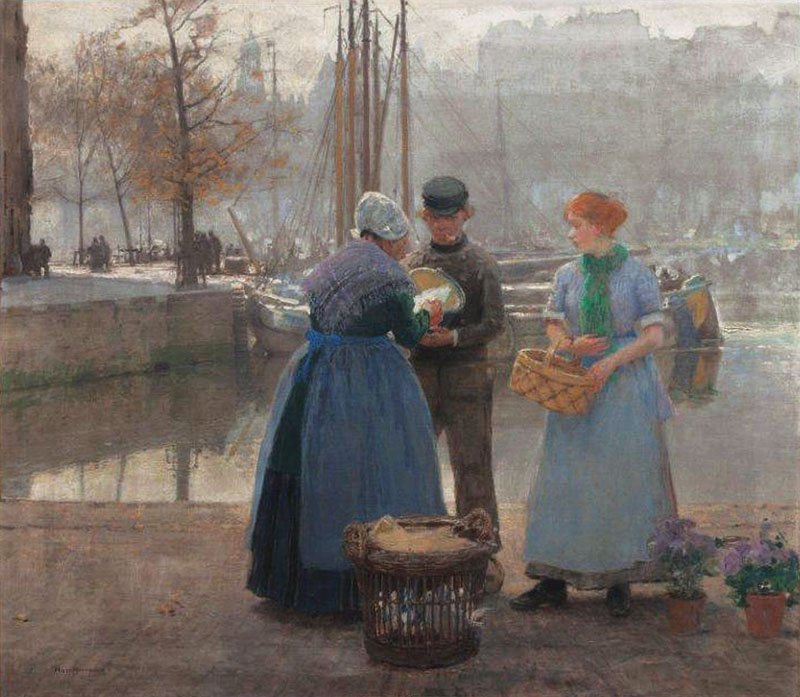
A Fall Morning in Rotterdam

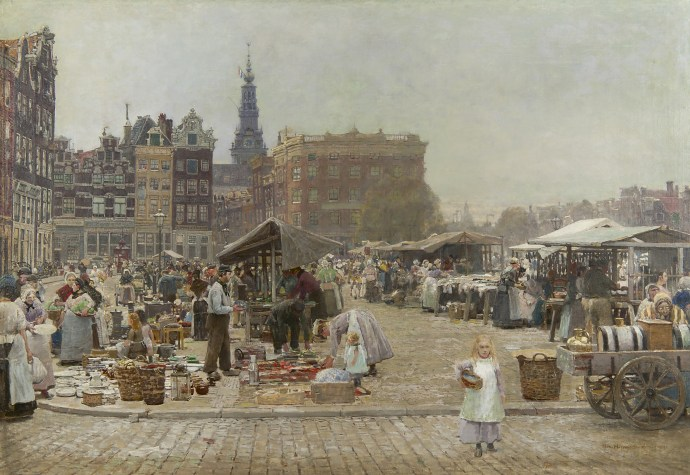
Nieuwmarkt, Amsterdam

Johann Emil Rudolf Herrmann, known as Hans (8 March 1858 – 21 July 1942) was a German landscape and genre painter. He specialized in scenes of the Netherlands.

== Life and work ==
He was born in Berlin. He studied at the Prussian Academy of Arts with Otto Knille, Karl Gussow and Christian Wilberg. From 1879 to 1882, he took classes in landscape painting from Eugen Dücker at the Kunstakademie Düsseldorf. Regular study trips took him to France, Italy, and Holland, where he attended the "Art Summer School" of the American-born painter, George Hitchcock. He opened his own studio in 1883, and visited Holland annually after 1886.

Together with Max Liebermann and Walter Leistikow, he was a founding member of the Vereinigung der XI, a progressive artists' group opposed to what they felt were outdated academic traditions. From 1879, he was a frequent exhibitor at the Große Berliner Kunstausstellung and the Glaspalast in Munich, as well as at lesser-known exhibitions in Düsseldorf, Dresden, and outside Germany. From 1886 to 1890, he provided illustrations for Die Gartenlaube.

He died in 1942 in Berlin, at the age of eighty-four, due to "cardiac insufficiency". He was interred in the Friedhof Zehlendorf. In 1987, his burial place was designated an "Ehrengrab" (grave of honor). There is also a commemorative plaque at the Herrmann family burial plot in Kreuzberg.

== Sources ==
- "Herrmann, Hans". In: Friedrich von Boetticher: Malerwerke des 19. Jahrhunderts. Beitrag zur Kunstgeschichte, Vol.1/2, Heideck–Mayer, Louis. Boetticher’s Verlag, Dresden 1895, pp. 509–510 (Online)
- Axel Holck: "Hans Herrmann". In: Christian Blangstrup (Ed.): Salmonsens Konversationsleksikon, 2nd ed., Vol.11: Hasselmus–Hven. J. H. Schultz Forlag, Copenhagen 1921, pg.354 (Online)
- "Herrmann, Hans". In: Hans Vollmer (Ed.): Allgemeines Lexikon der bildenden Künstler des XX. Jahrhunderts, Vol.2: E–J. E. A. Seemann, Leipzig 1955, pg.430
- "Herrmann, Hans (Joh. Emil Rudolf)", In: Allgemeines Lexikon der Bildenden Künstler von der Antike bis zur Gegenwart, Vol. 16: Hansen–Heubach, pp. 496–497, E. A. Seemann, Leipzig 1923
