= Hermon (disambiguation) =

Hermon may refer to:

== Places ==
- Mount Hermon, a high mountain on the border between Syria and Lebanon
- Hermon, Armenia

=== South Africa ===
- Hermon, South Africa

=== United States ===
- Hermon, Los Angeles, California, a district of Los Angeles
- Hermon, Maine, a town
  - Hermon High School
- Hermon (town), New York
  - Hermon (village), New York, within the town of Hermon

=== Wales ===
- Hermon, Anglesey
- Hermon, Pembrokeshire
- Hermon Chapel, Penrhiwceiber

== Other uses ==
- Hermon (name)
- Battle of Mount Hermon (disambiguation)

== See also ==
- Herman (disambiguation)
- Hermann (disambiguation)
