= Hors, Armenia =

Hors Հորս
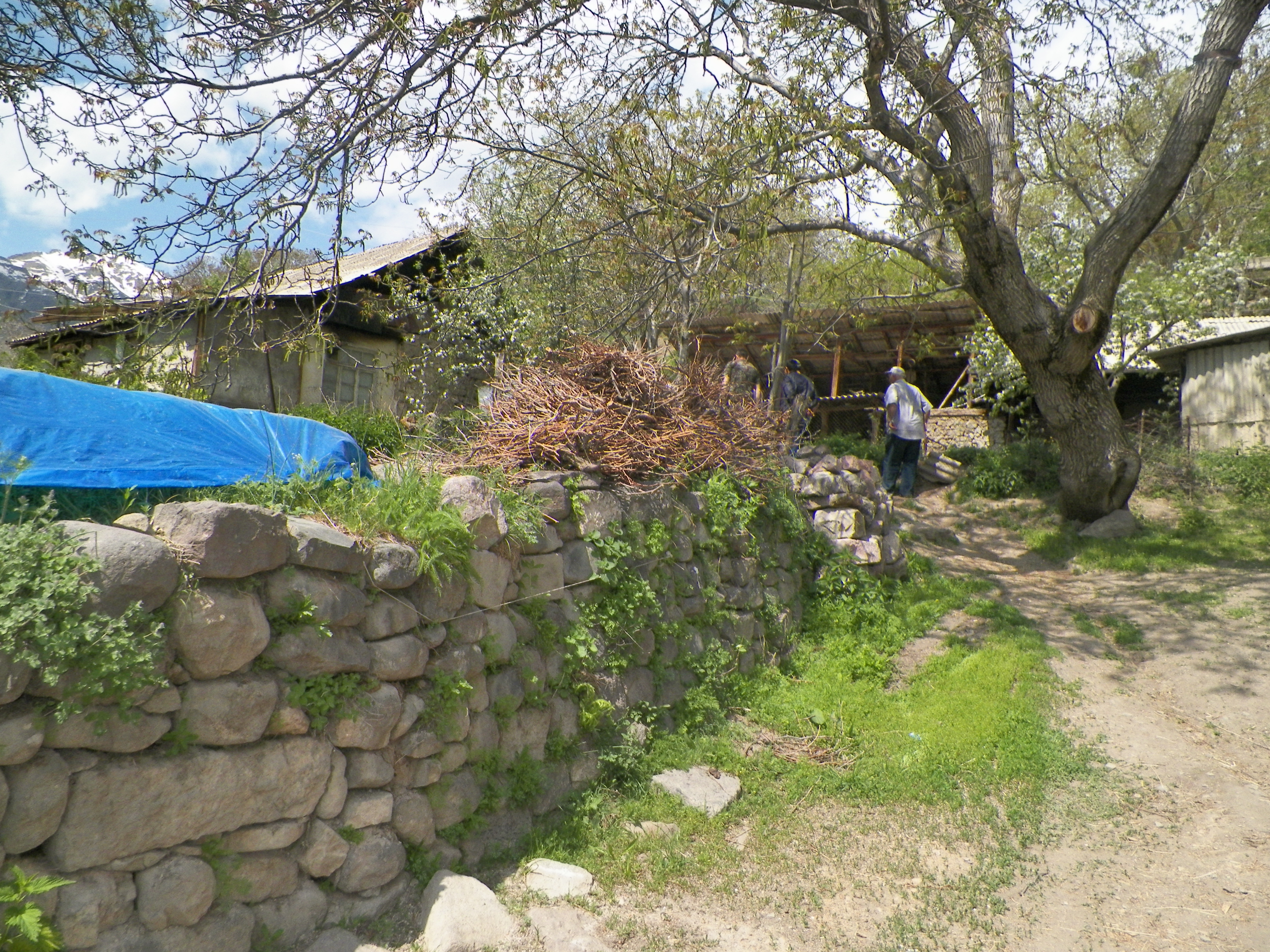

- Location within Armenia Location within Vayots Dzor
- Coordinates: 39°51′45″N 45°13′49″E
- Country: Armenia
- Province: Vayots Dzor
- Municipality: Yeghegis

Population (2011)
  - Total: 321
- Time zone: UTC+4 (AMT)

Hors (Armenian: Հորս) is a village in the Yeghegis Municipality of the Vayots Dzor Province in Armenia. It is located 24 km northwest of the Province center, on the bank of the right-hand Hors tributary of Selimaget, 6–7 km northwest of the confluence of the Selimaget and Yeghegis rivers.

== History ==
Hors village was resettled in 1918 by families who immigrated from Metsop or Otsop (now Badamlu) village of Nakhichevan. The village speaks the local dialect of Vayots Dzor and Northern Nakhichevan, the intermediate dialect of Chahuk-Vayk. Contrary to initial assumptions, the village has an older history, which is evidenced by the 13th-century half-ruined "Chesari Darpas" (Gates of Chesar) structure built in the center of the village with ornate sculptures, hewn walls, and the adjacent church complex built with pink stones.

== Geography ==
Situated at an elevation of 1650 m above sea level, the village is located 20 km away from the Province center.

Gndasar Mountain, with a height of 2960 meters, overlooks the village. The water supply for the village is sourced from the springs of Gndasar and the surrounding mountains. Horbategh borders the communities of Shatin, Salli, and Taratumb.

== Climate ==
The climate is cold in winter and cool in summer.

== Population ==
According to the results of the RA 2011 census, Hors had a recorded permanent population of 321 individuals, with a current population of 257 people.

The population dynamics of Horbategh over the years:

Year	1831	1897	1926	1939	1959	1970	1979	1989	2001	2011
Population	219	1136	551	938	649	607	474	286	317	321

== Occupation ==
The population is engaged in animal husbandry, viticulture, and tobacco cultivation.

== Historical and cultural sites ==
Khachkars (cross-stones) from the 13th and 14th centuries and a church dating back to the 14th century have been preserved in Hors.

== Public facilities ==
There is a primary school, a medical station, and a house of culture in the village.

== Gallery ==
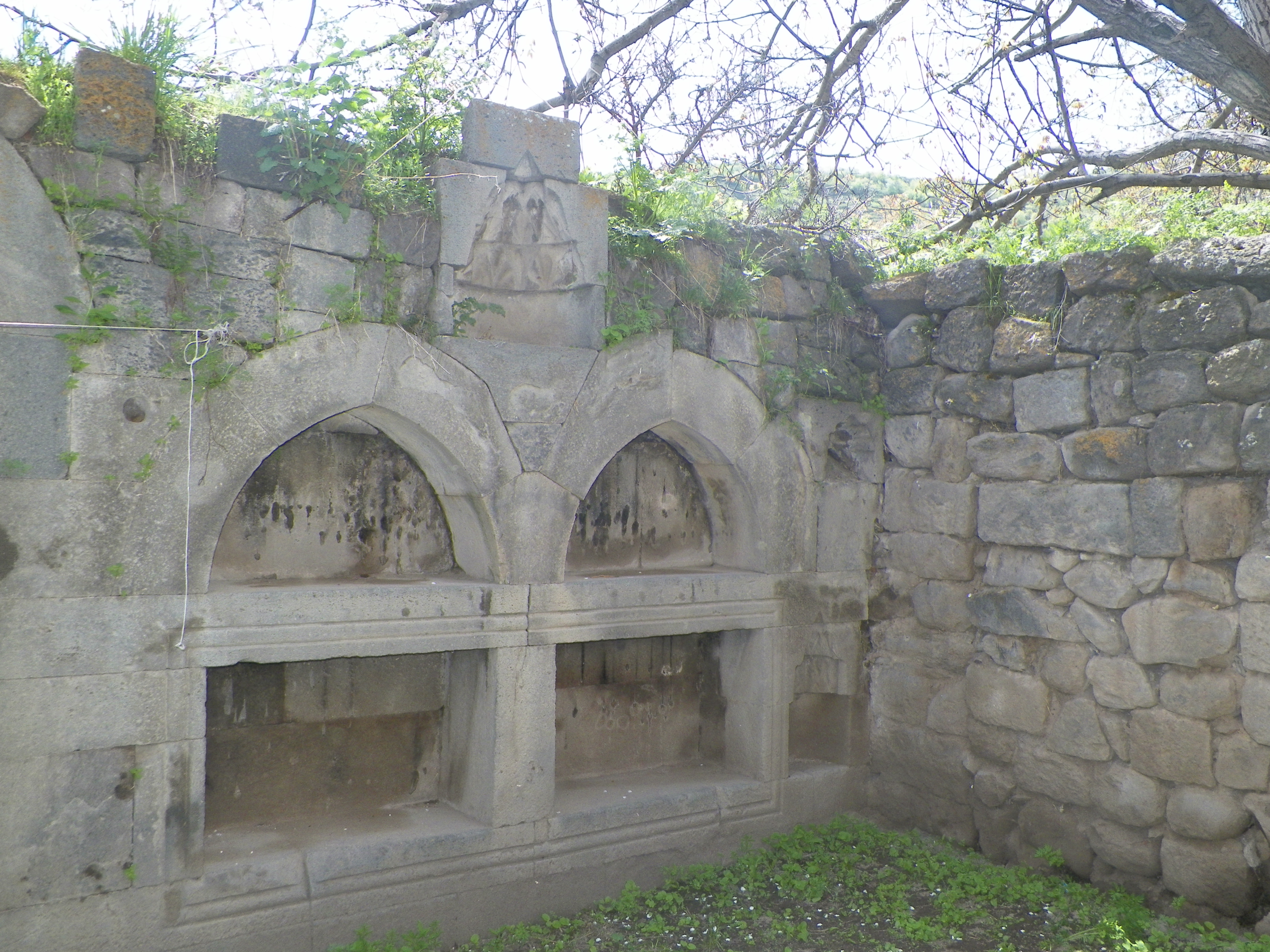
Prince Chesar Orbelian's mansion
