= Hermann =

Hermann or Herrmann may refer to:

- Hermann (name), list of people with this name
- Arminius, chieftain of the Germanic Cherusci tribe in the 1st century, known as Hermann in the German language
- Éditions Hermann, French publisher
- Hermann, Missouri, a town on the Missouri River in the United States
  - Hermann AVA, Missouri wine region
- The German SC1000 bomb of World War II was nicknamed the "Hermann" by the British, in reference to Hermann Göring
- Herrmann Hall, the former Hotel Del Monte, at the Naval Postgraduate School, Monterey, California
- Memorial Hermann Healthcare System, a large health system in Southeast Texas
- The Herrmann Brain Dominance Instrument (HBDI), a system to measure and describe thinking preferences in people
- Hermann station (disambiguation), stations of the name
- Hermann (crater), a small lunar impact crater in the western Oceanus Procellarum
- Hermann Huppen, a Belgian comic book artist
- Hermann 19, an American sailboat design built by Ted Hermann's Boat Shop
- Hermann 22, an American sailboat design built by Ted Hermann's Boat Shop

== See also ==
- Heermann (disambiguation)
- Herman (disambiguation)
- Herrman (redirects to here)
- Herrmann (redirects to here)
