= Heerma =

Heerma may refer to:

- Enneüs Heerma Bridge, a bridge in the Netherlands

== People with the surname ==
- Enneüs Heerma (1944–1999), Dutch politician
- Pieter Heerma (born 1977), Dutch politician

== See also ==
- Heermann (disambiguation)
