= Hermanator =

Hermanator or Herminator may refer to:

- Herman Cain, U.S. businessman and politician
- Hermann Maier, Austrian alpine skier
- Herman Ene-Purcell, Australian boxer
- "The Hermanator" (TV episode), season 1 episode 9 of RoboCop: Alpha Commando
- "The Herminator" (TV episode), season 1 episode 6 of Herman's Head, see List of Herman's Head episodes

== See also ==
- Terminator (disambiguation)
- Herman (disambiguation)
