= Getikvank =

Getikvank Գետիկվանք
- Location within Armenia
- Coordinates: 39°55′10″N 45°28′20″E
- Country: Armenia
- Province: Vayots Dzor
- Municipality: Yeghegis

Population (2011)
  - Total: 0
- Time zone: UTC+4

Getikvank (Armenian: Գետիկվանք; Azerbaijani: Gədikvəng) is an abandoned village in the Vayots Dzor Province of Armenia. It belonged to the community of Vardahovit.

== History ==
The village was populated by Azerbaijanis. In March-April 1989, ethnic clashes and incidents became frequent because of the Nagorno-Karabakh conflict. Azerbaijanis were deported from the village Armenian refugees who were deported from different settlements of Nakhichevan (Nu Aznaberd) and Azerbaijan settled in the village.
