= Kalasar, Armenia =

Kalasar Կալասար
- Location within Armenia Location within Vayots Dzor
- Coordinates: 39°53′00″N 45°25′07″E
- Country: Armenia
- Province: Vayots Dzor
- Municipality: Yeghegis

Population (2011)
  - Total: 0
- Time zone: UTC+4

Kalasar (Armenian: Կալասար; Azerbaijani: Qalasar) is an abandoned village in the Vayots Dzor Province of Armenia. It once belonged to the community of Hermon.

== History ==
The village was populated by Azerbaijanis. In March-April 1989, ethnic clashes and incidents became frequent because of the Nagorno-Karabakh conflict. In order to prevent further clashes, the leadership of Yeghegnadzor and Vayk regions organized the safe transfer of Azeris to Nakhichevan. Armenian refugees who were deported from different settlements of Nakhichevan (Nu Aznaberd) and Azerbaijan settled in the village.
