= Goghtanik =

Goghtanik Գողթանիկ
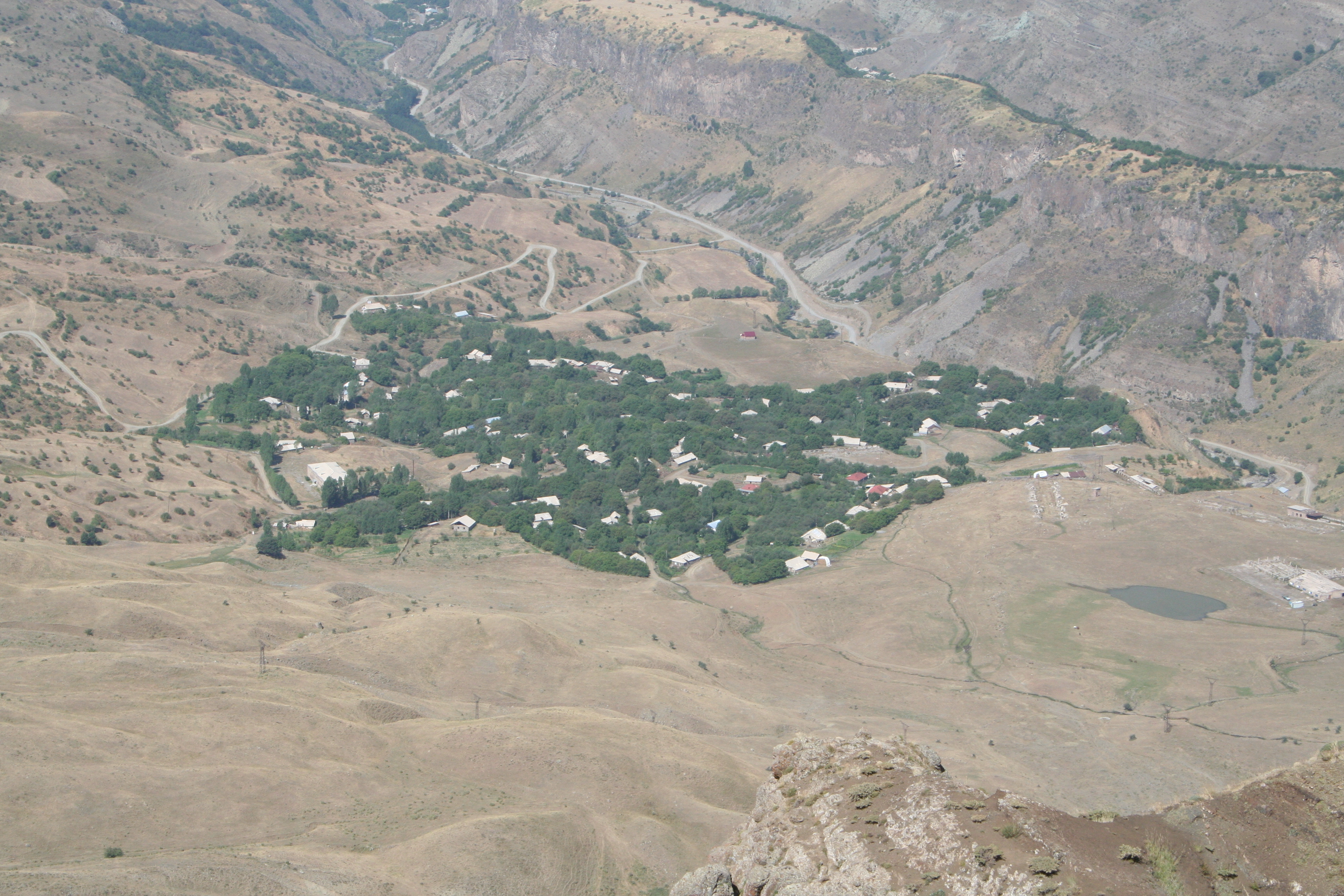

- Location within Armenia Location within Vayots Dzor
- Coordinates: 39°52′02″N 45°28′19″E
- Country: Armenia
- Province: Vayots Dzor
- Municipality: Yeghegis

Population (2011)
  - Total: 190
- Time zone: UTC+4 (AMT)

Goghtanik (Armenian: Գողթանիկ) is a village in the Yeghegis Municipality of the Vayots Dzor Province in Armenia.

== Demographics ==
Its population rose to 763 by 1916, but fell to 330 by 1931.

According to Statistical Committee of Armenia, as of 2011, the village has population is 190.

== Gallery ==
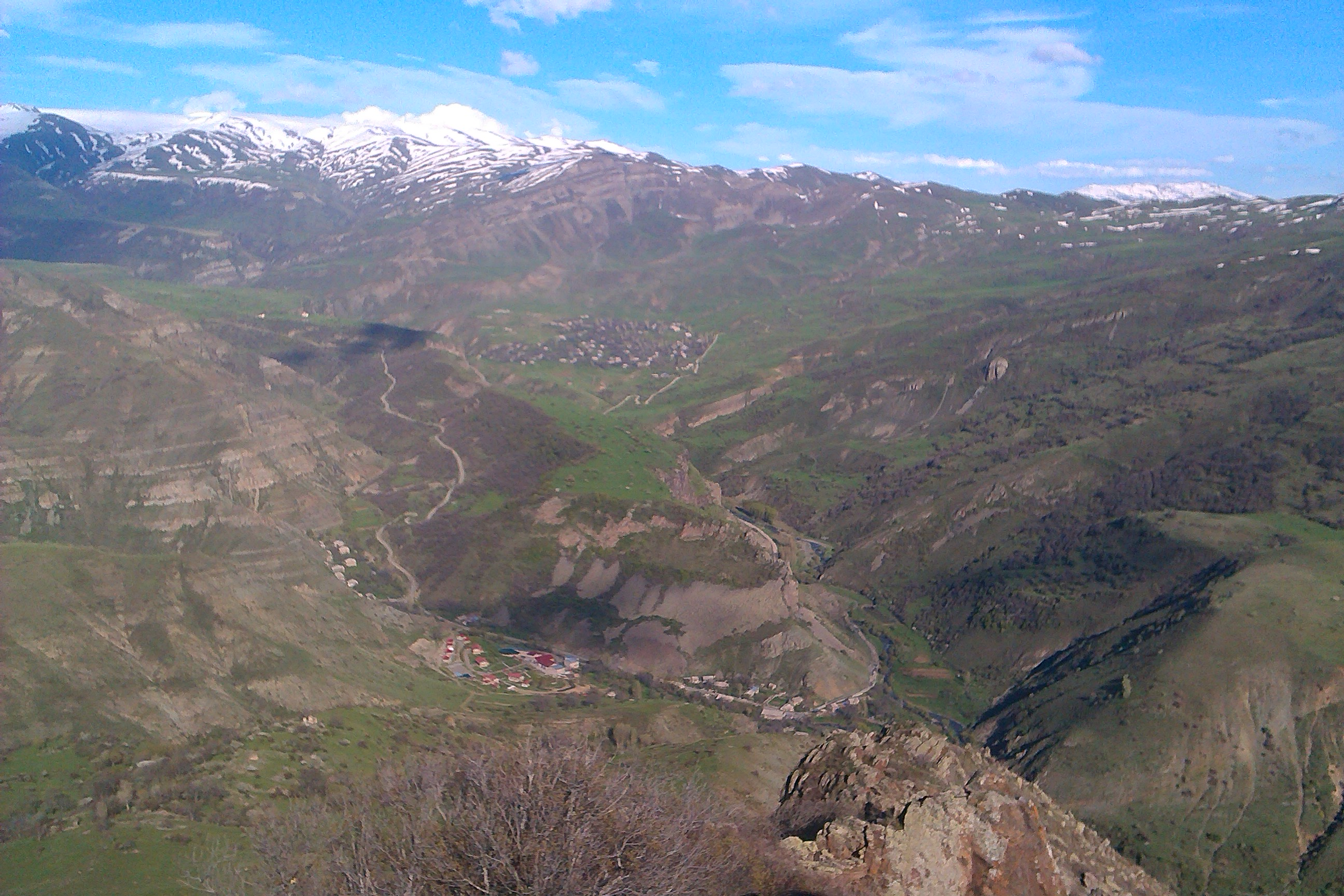
View of Goghtanik and the neighboring Hermon village
