= Arates =

Arates Արատես
- Location within Armenia Location within Vayots Dzor
- Coordinates: 39°54′15″N 45°26′24″E
- Country: Armenia
- Province: Vayots Dzor
- Municipality: Yeghegis

Population (2011)
  - Total: 0
- Time zone: UTC+4

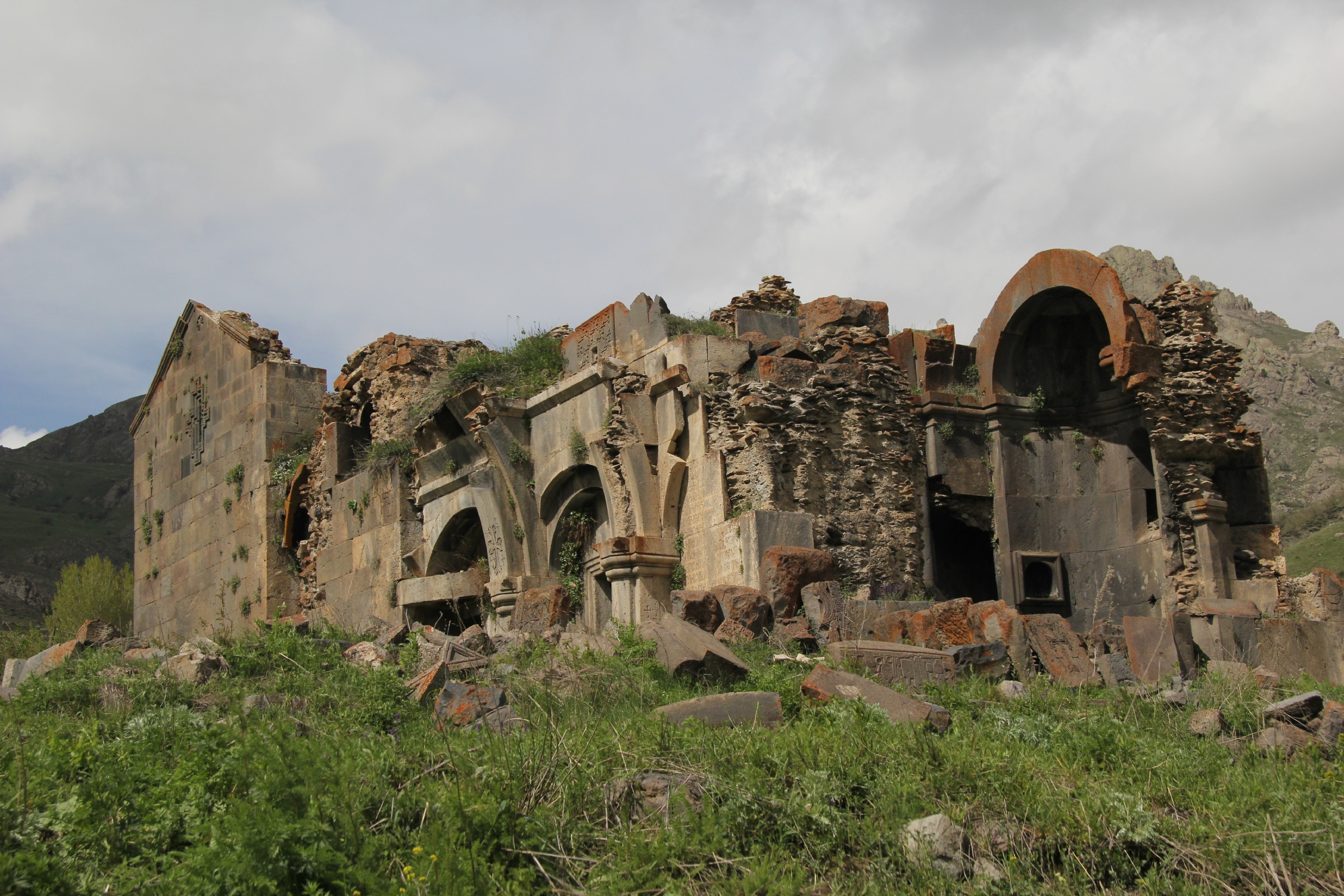
A monastery located within Arates

Arates (Armenian: Արատես) is an abandoned village in the Yeghegis Municipality of the Vayots Dzor Province of Armenia.
