= Yeghegis Community =

Yeghegis Եղեգիս
- Rural Community
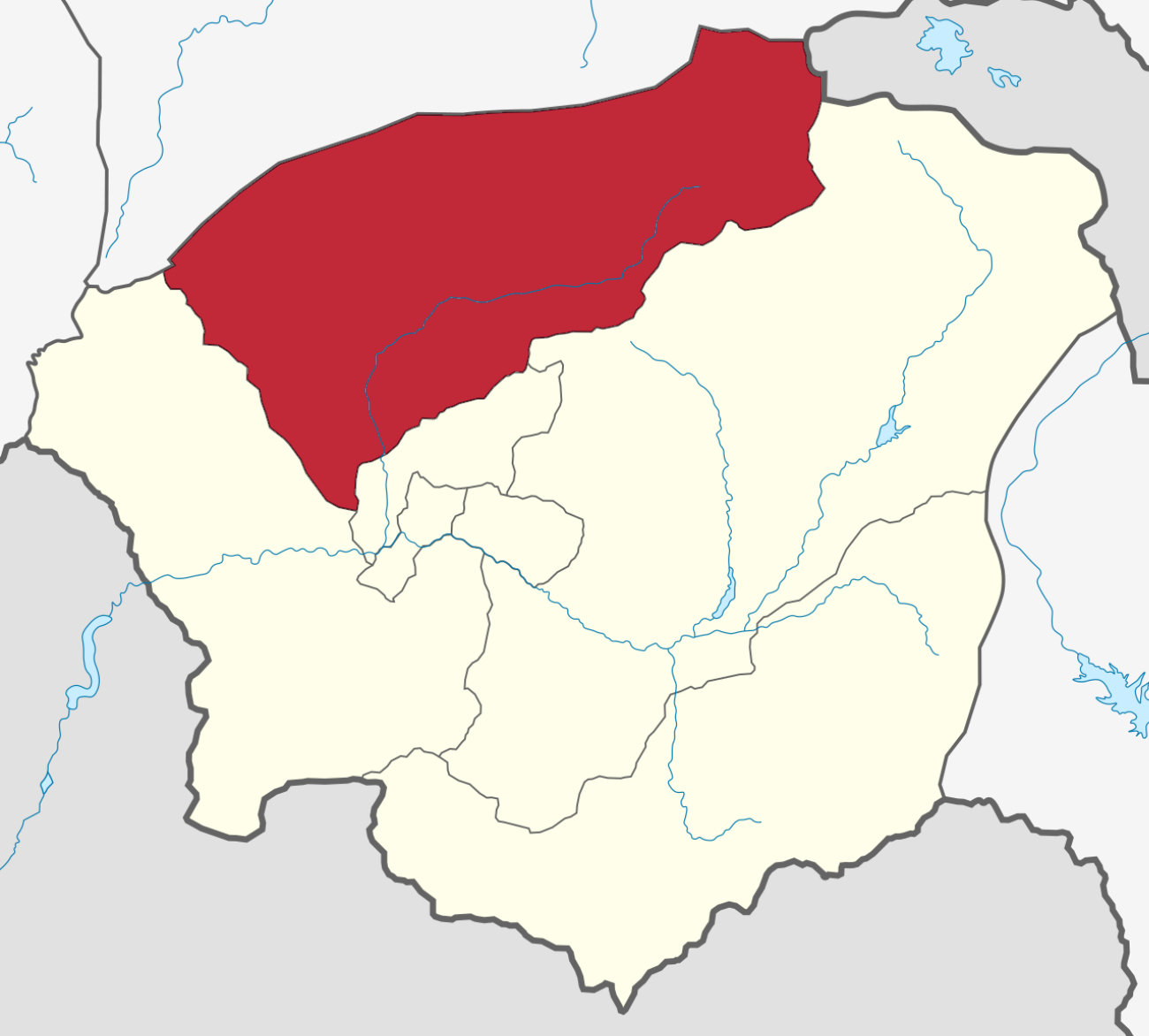
- Coordinates: 39°52′N 45°20′E
- Country: Armenia
- Province: Vayots Dzor
- Formed: 9 June 2017
- Administrative centre: Shatin

Government
  - Mayor: Artur Stepanayan

Area
  - Total: 477 km^{2} (184 sq mi)

Population (2011 census)
  - Total: 5,961
  - Density: 12.5/km^{2} (32.4/sq mi)
- Time zone: AMT (UTC+04)
- Postal code: 3601–3810
- ISO 3166 code: AM-VD
- FIPS 10-4: AM10

Yeghegis Community (Armenian: Եղեգիս Համայնք Yeghegis Hamaynk) is a rural community (municipality) and administrative subdivision of Vayots Dzor Province in southeastern Armenia, consisting of a group of villages whose administrative centre is Shatin.

== Villages ==
Settlement	Type	Population (2011 census)
Shatin	Village, administrative centre	1,736
Aghnjadzor	Village	412
Artabuynk	Village	984
Goghtanik	Village	190
Hermon	Village	180
Horbategh	Village	242
Hors	Village	321
Karaglukh	Village	743
Salli	Village	220
Sevazhayr	Village	13
Taratumb	Village	448
Vardahovit	Village	103
Yeghegis	Village	369
Arates	Abandoned village	0
Getikvank	Abandoned village	0
Kalasar	Abandoned village	0

== Politics ==
Yeghegis Municipal Assembly (Armenian: Եղեգիսի համայնքապետարան, Yeghegisi hamaynqapetaran) is the representative body in Meghri Municipality, consisting of 15 members who are elected every five years. In the September 2022 election Artur Stepanyan of Civil Contract party was elected mayor.

Party	2022	Current Municipal Assembly
**Civil Contract**	**9**	
Liberal Party	**6**	
Total	15	

Ruling coalition or party marked in bold.

== See also ==
- Vayots Dzor Province
