= Horbategh =

Horbategh Հորբատեղ
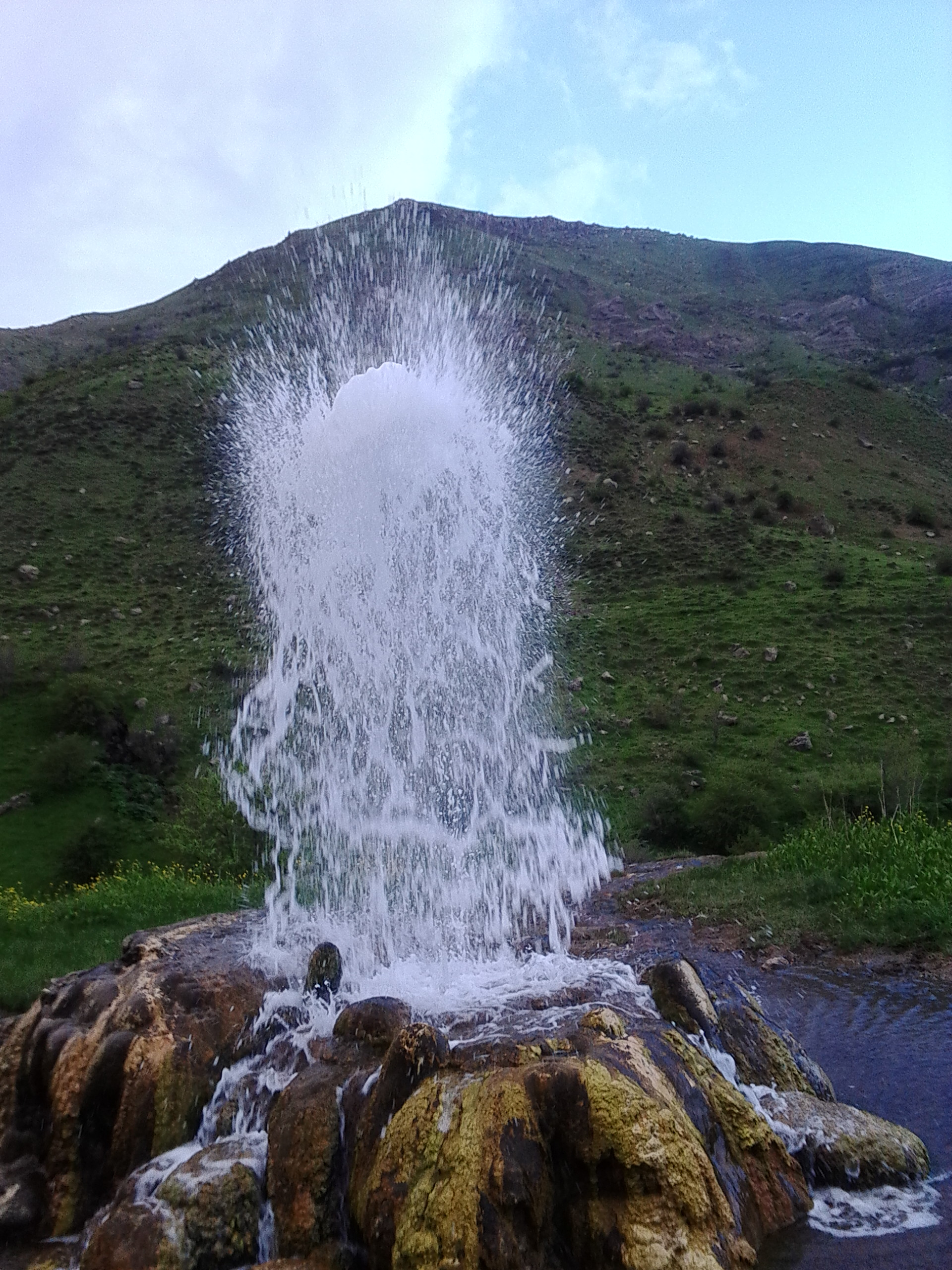
- Natural fountain in Horbategh

- Location within Armenia Location within Vayots Dzor
- Coordinates: 39°53′41″N 45°20′08″E
- Country: Armenia
- Province: Vayots Dzor
- Municipality: Yeghegis

Population (2011)
  - Total: 242
- Time zone: UTC+4 (AMT)

Horbategh (Armenian: Հորբատեղ) is a village in the Yeghegis Municipality of the Vayots Dzor Province in Armenia.

== Gallery ==
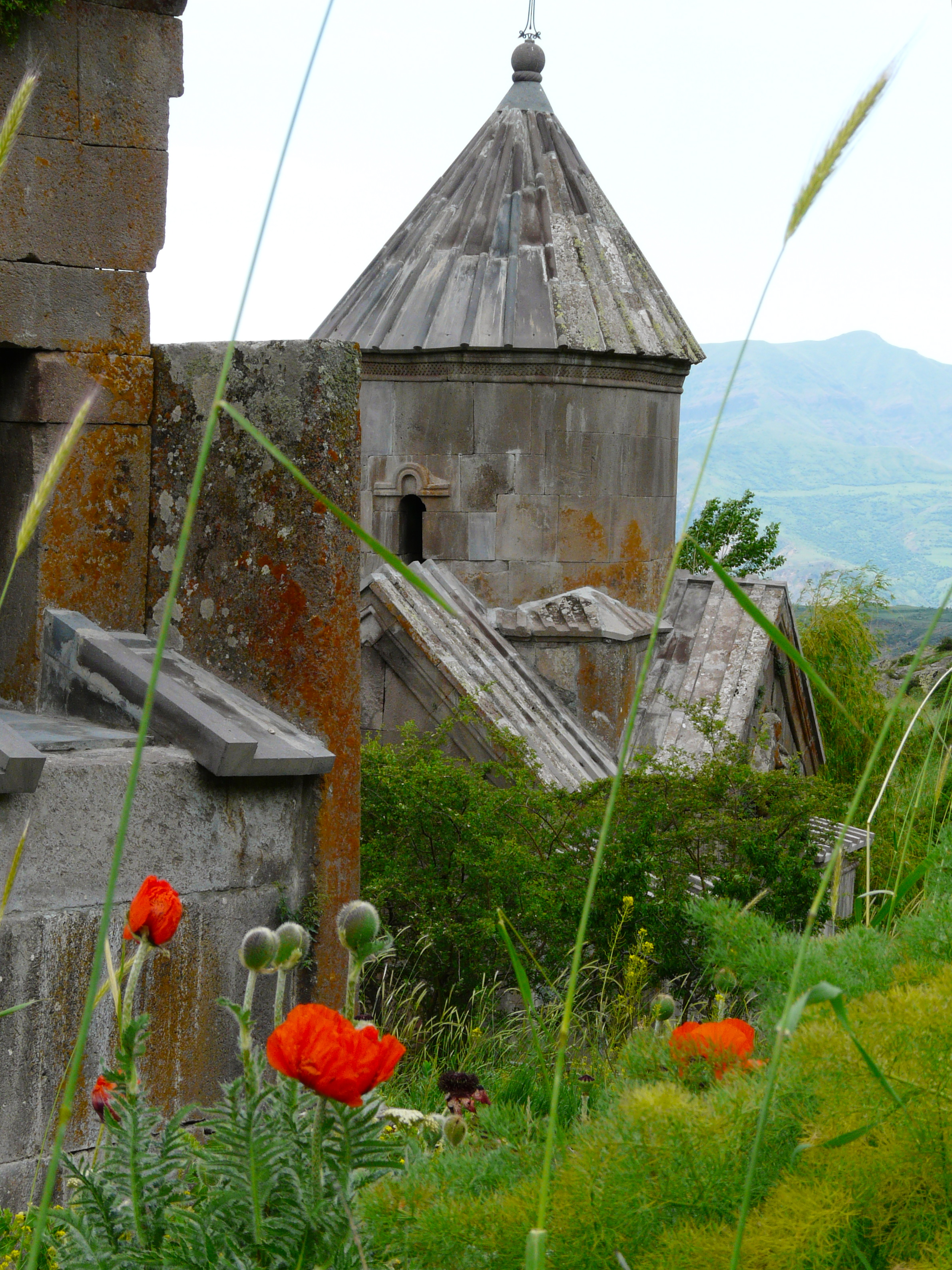
Church in Horbategh

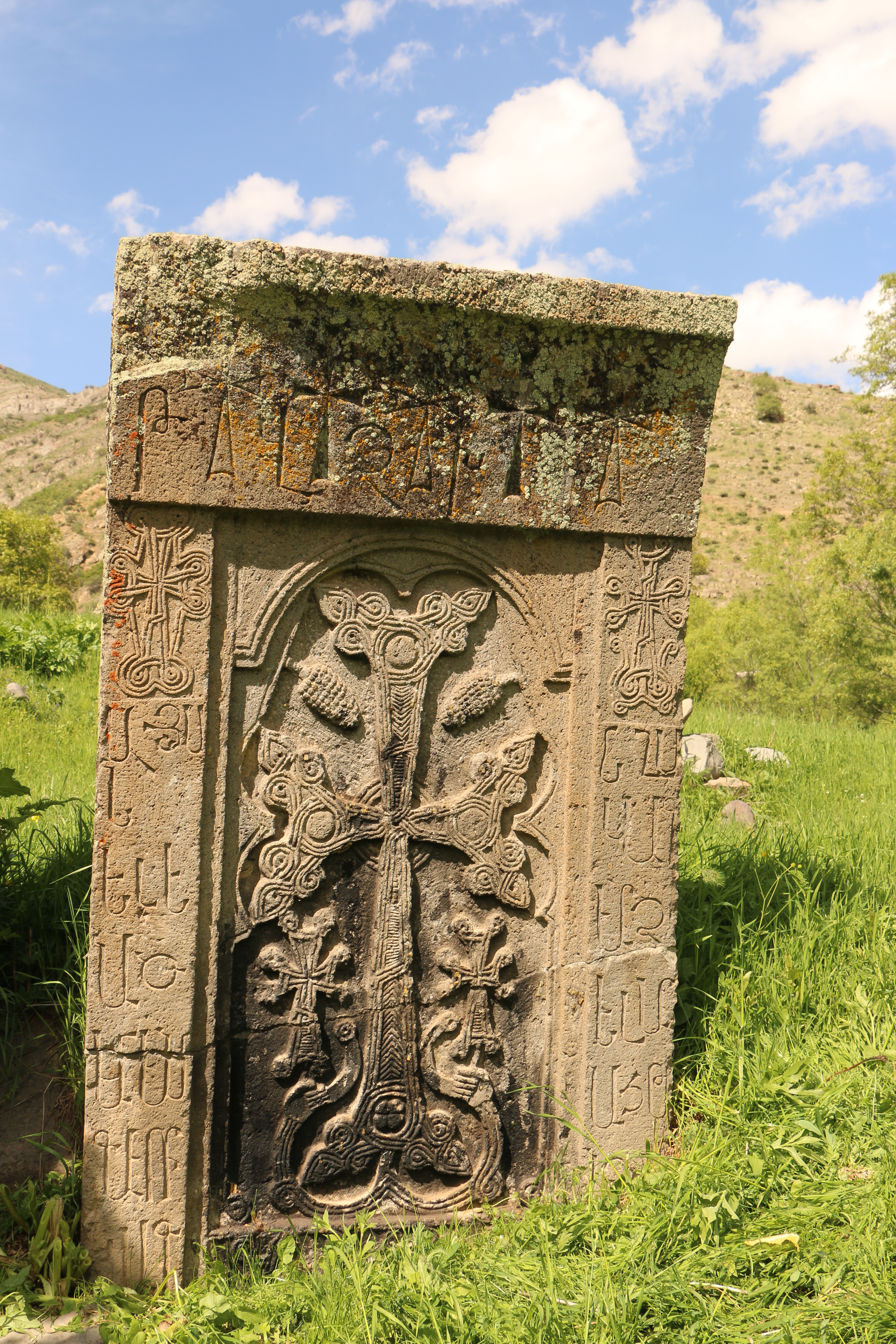
Khachkar from 1291

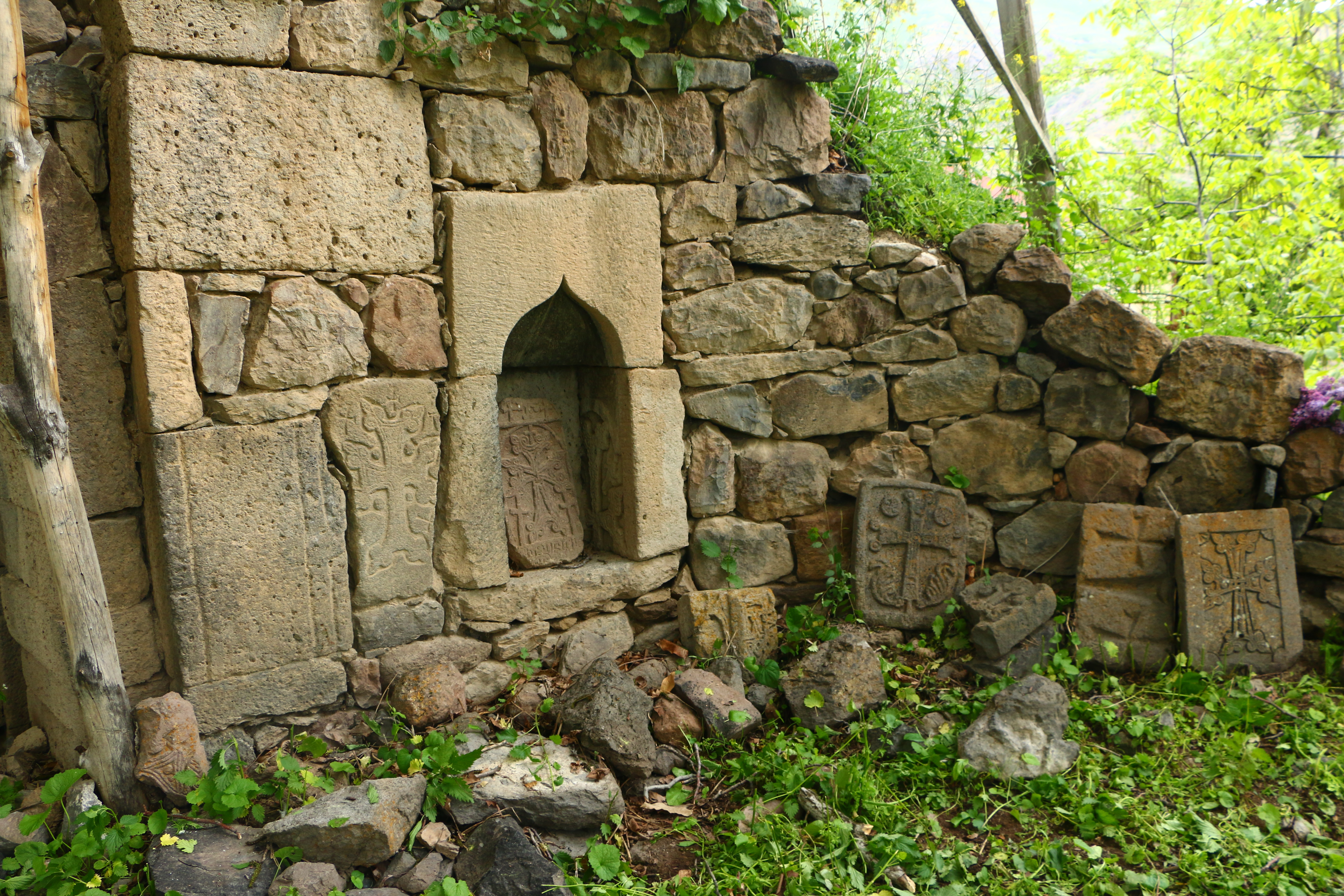
Saint Archangels church in Horbetegh
