= Hermon (name) =

Hermon is both a surname and a given name. Notable people with the name include:

Surname:

- Derek Hermon, American BMX and mountain-biker
- John Hermon, Royal Ulster Constabulary
- Sylvia Hermon, Northern Ireland politician

Given name:

- Hermon Henry Cook, Ontario lumber merchant and politician
- Hermon di Giovanno, Greek painter
- Hermon Atkins MacNeil, American sculptor
- Hermon Hosmer Scott, American inventor
- Hermon Williams, American college football coach
