= Hermann station =

Hermann station may refer to:

- Hermann station (Missouri), an Amtrak station in Hermann, Missouri
- Hermann Park / Rice University (METRORail station), a METRORail station in Houston, Texas
- Memorial Hermann Hospital / Houston Zoo (METRORail station), a METRORail station in Houston, Texas

== See also ==
- Hermann (disambiguation)
