= Karaglukh =

Karaglukh Քարագլուխ
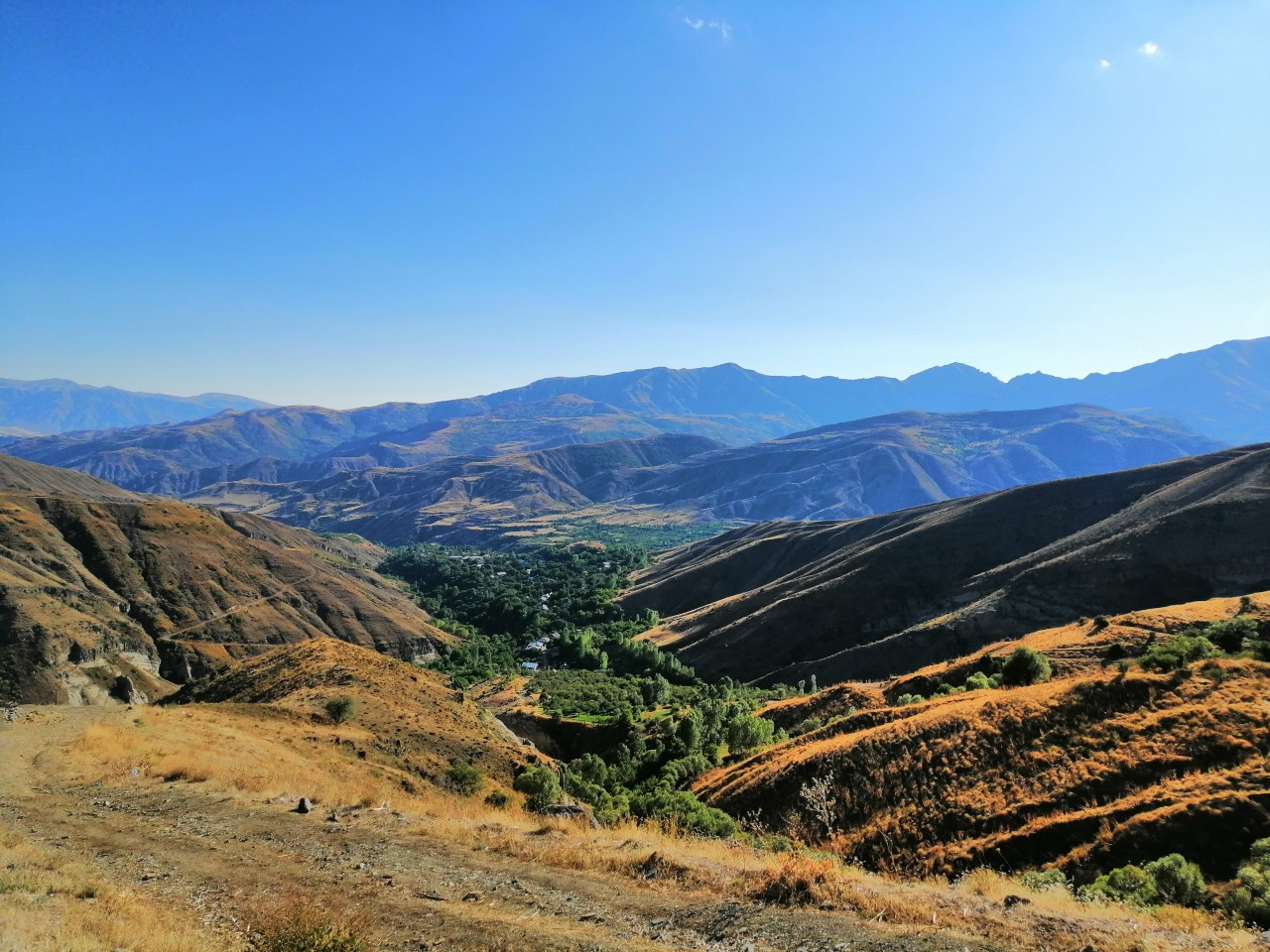

- Location within Armenia Location within Vayots Dzor
- Coordinates: 39°53′44″N 45°16′08″E
- Country: Armenia
- Province: Vayots Dzor
- Municipality: Yeghegis

Population (2011)
  - Total: 743
- Time zone: UTC+4 (AMT)

Karaglukh (Armenian: Քարագլուխ) is a village in the Yeghegis Municipality of the Vayots Dzor Province in Armenia.

== Gallery ==
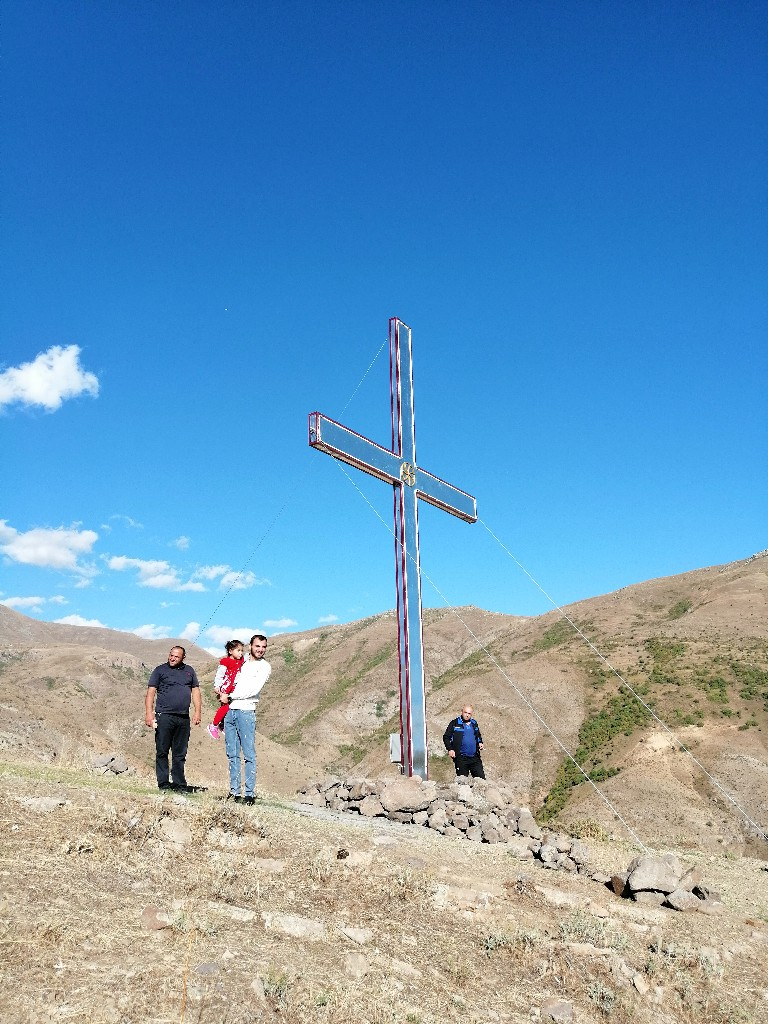
Cross in Karaglukh
