= Sevazhayr =

Sevazhayr Սևաժայռ
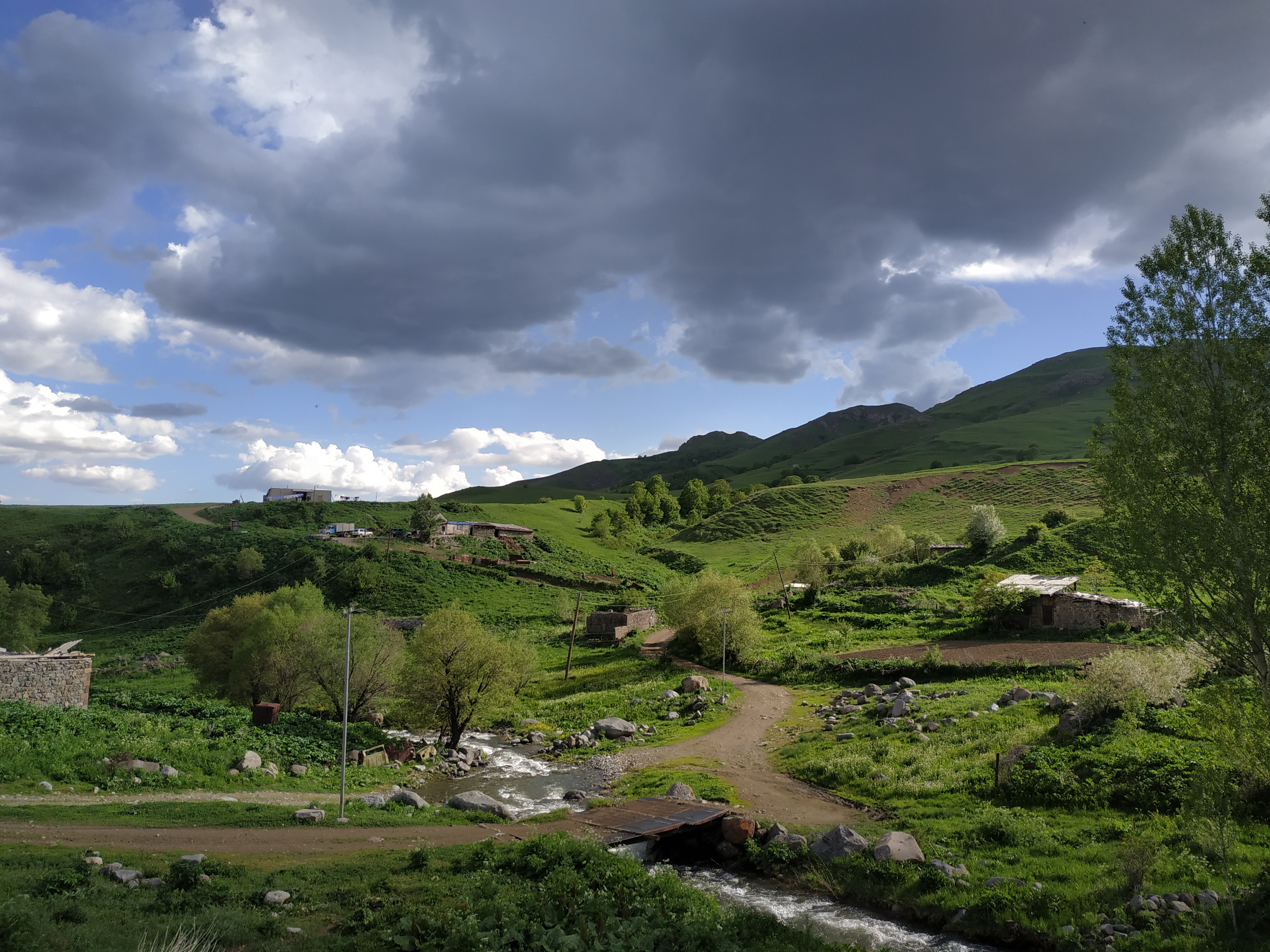

- Location within Armenia Location within Vayots Dzor
- Coordinates: 39°54′40″N 45°28′30″E
- Country: Armenia
- Province: Vayots Dzor
- Municipality: Yeghegis

Population (2011)
  - Total: 13
- Time zone: UTC+4 (AMT)

Sevazhayr (Armenian: Սևաժայռ) is a village in the Yeghegis Municipality of the Vayots Dzor Province in Armenia.

== Gallery ==
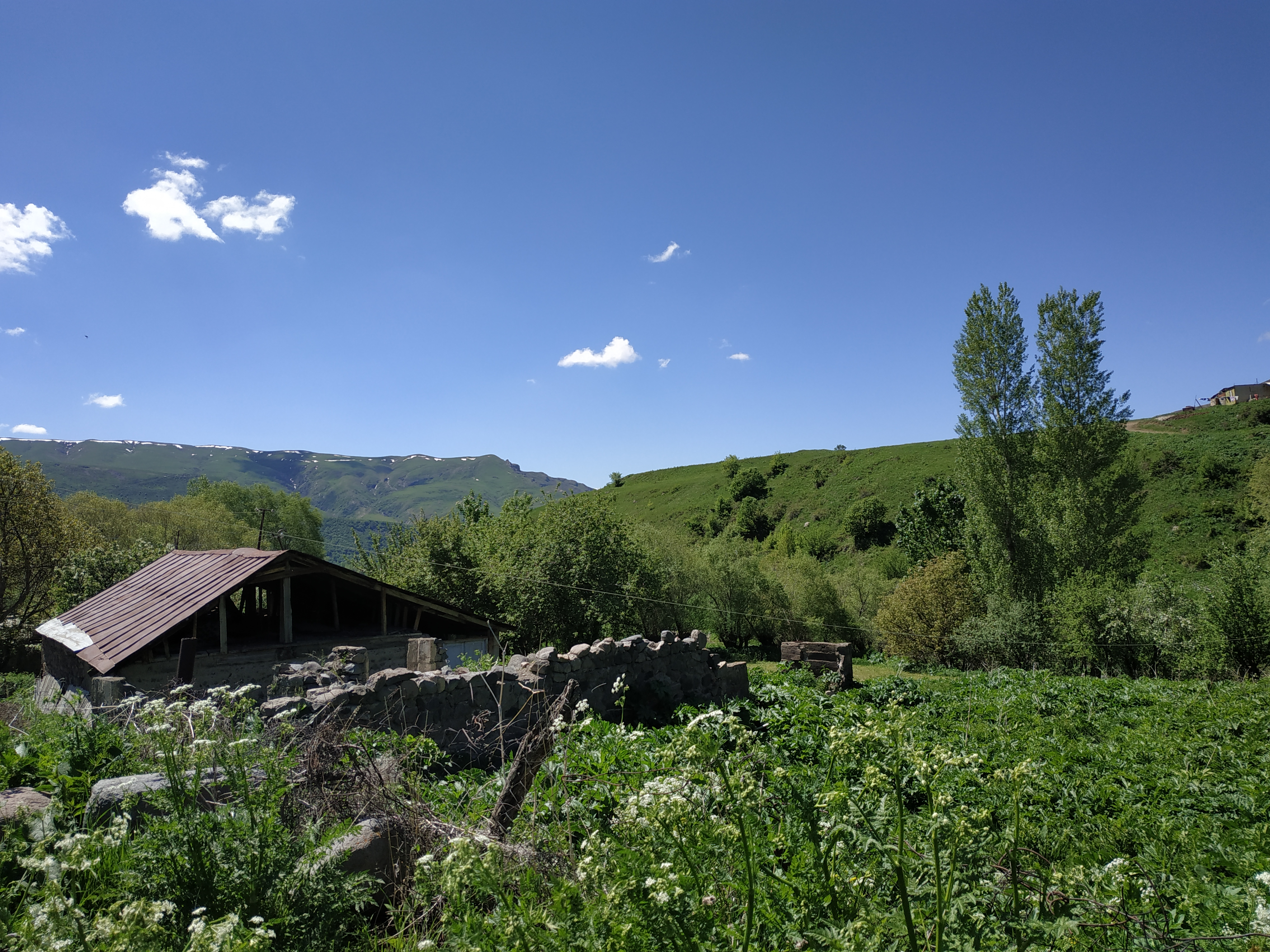

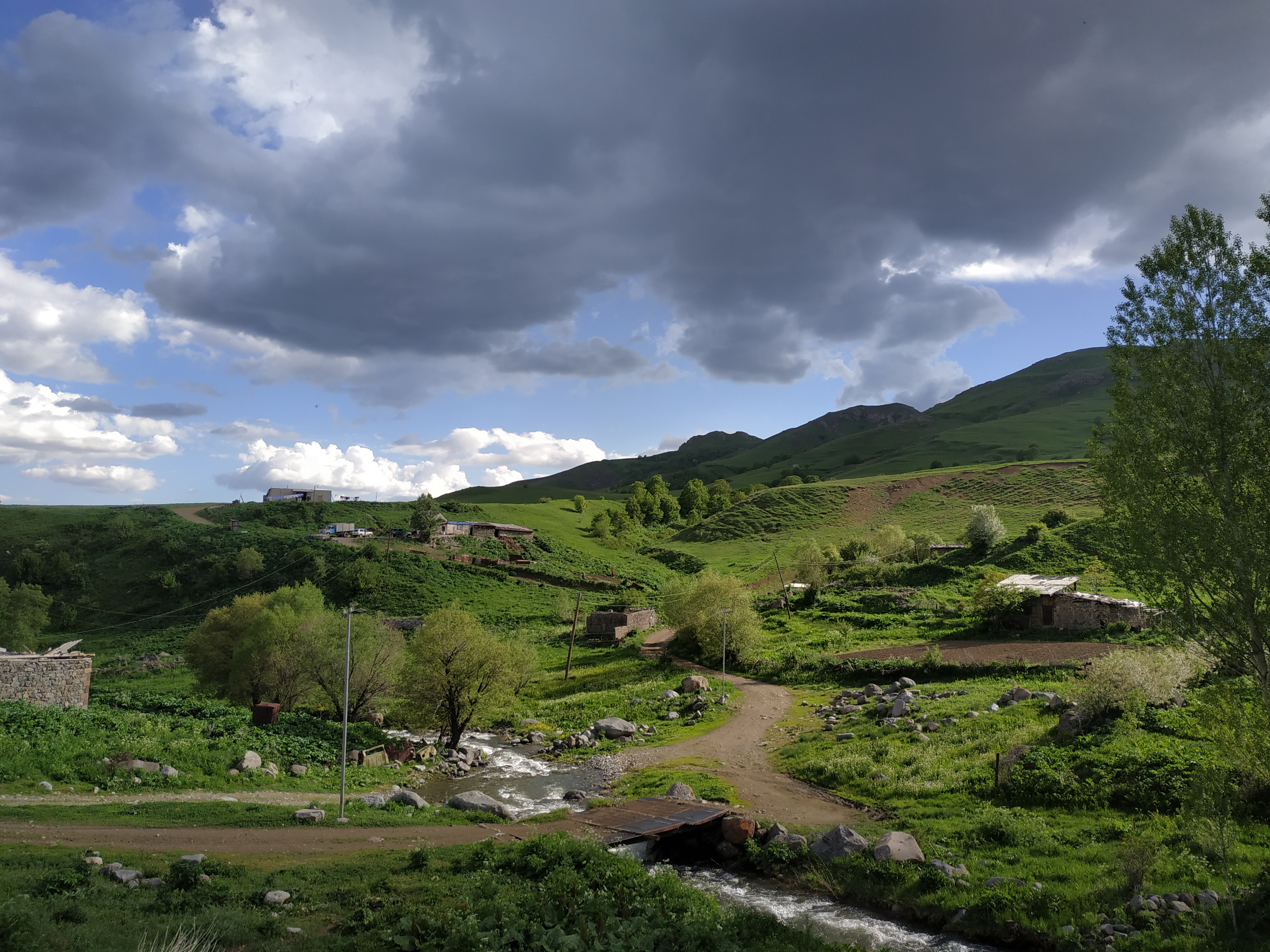

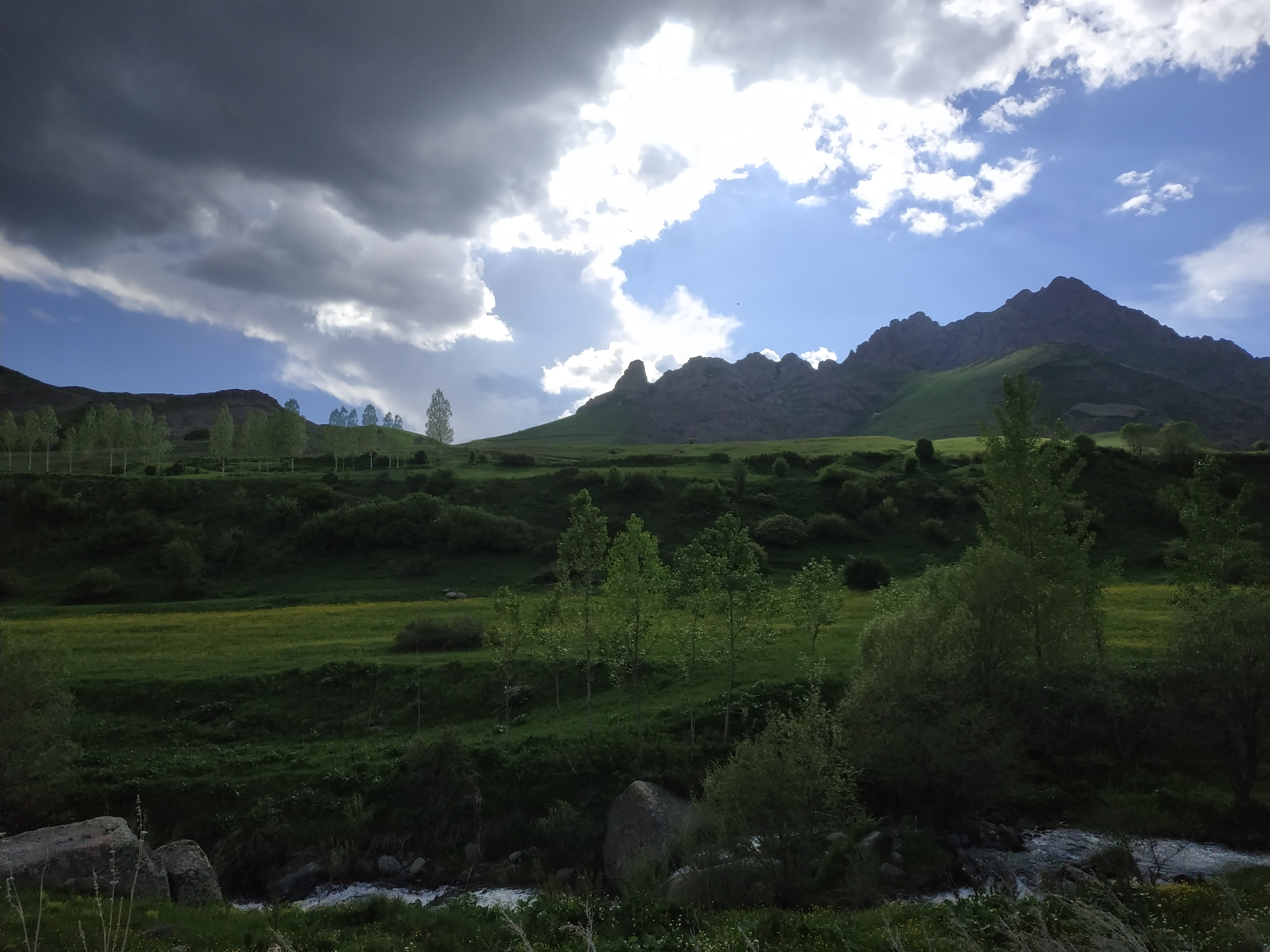

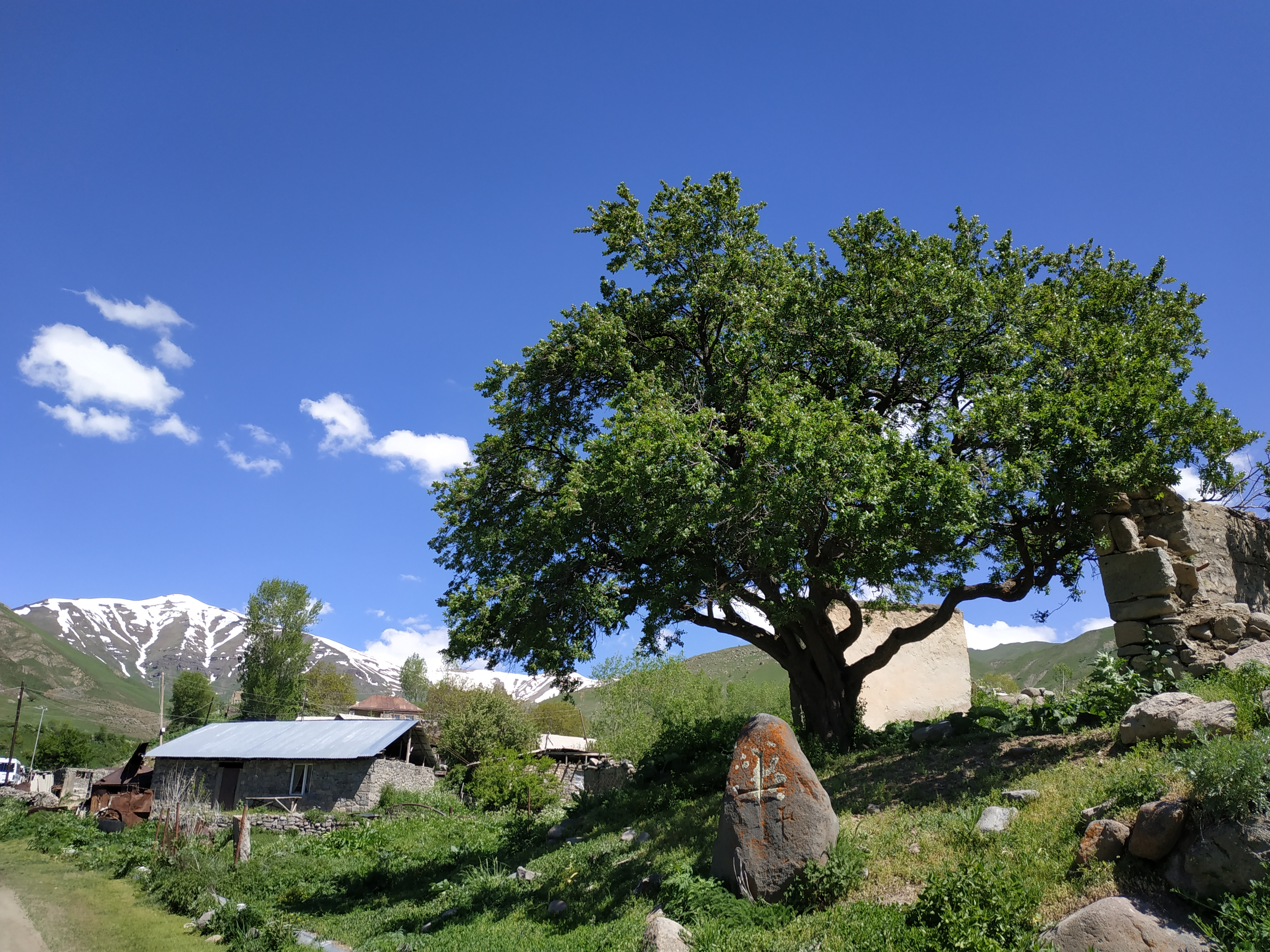

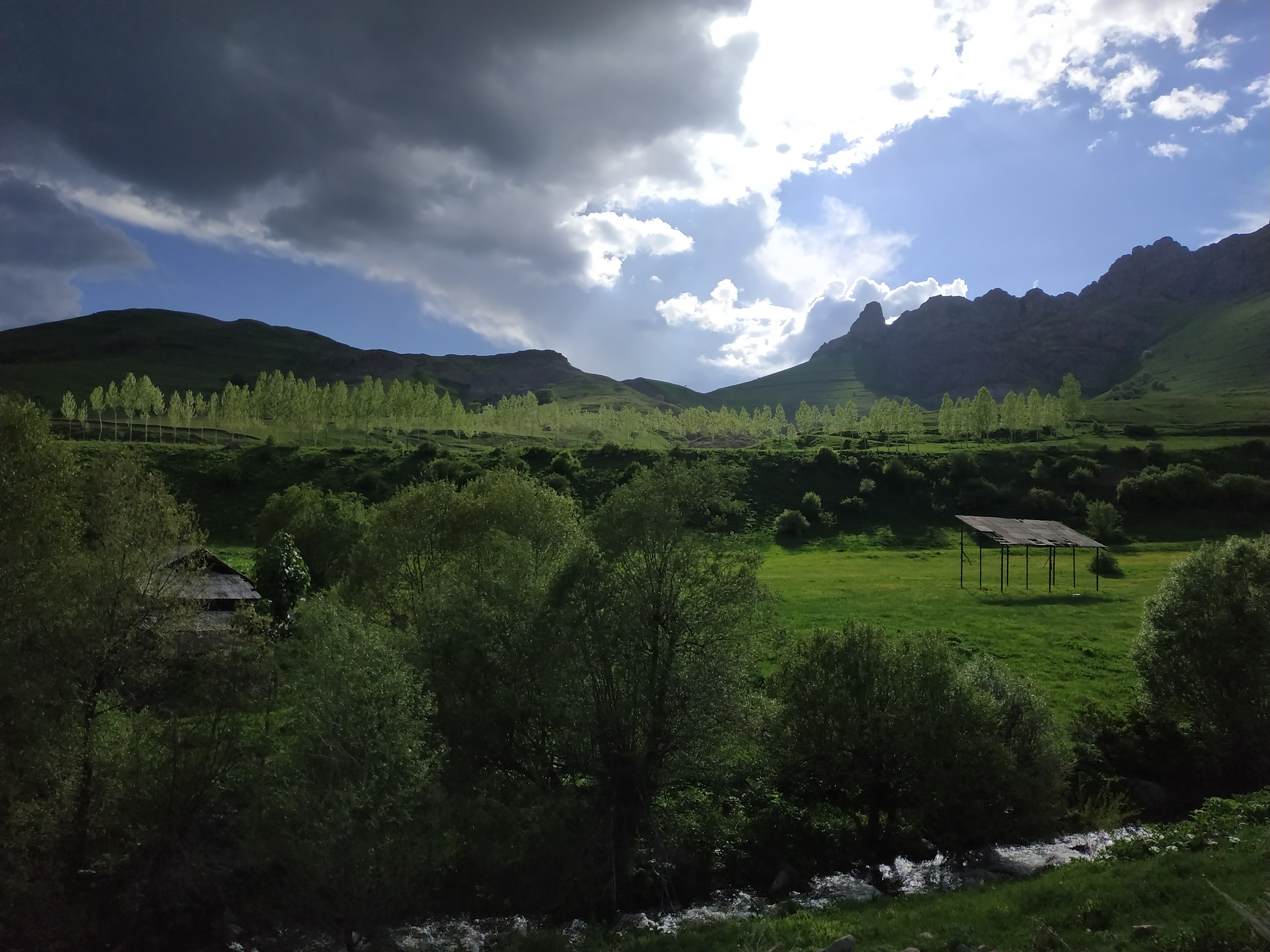

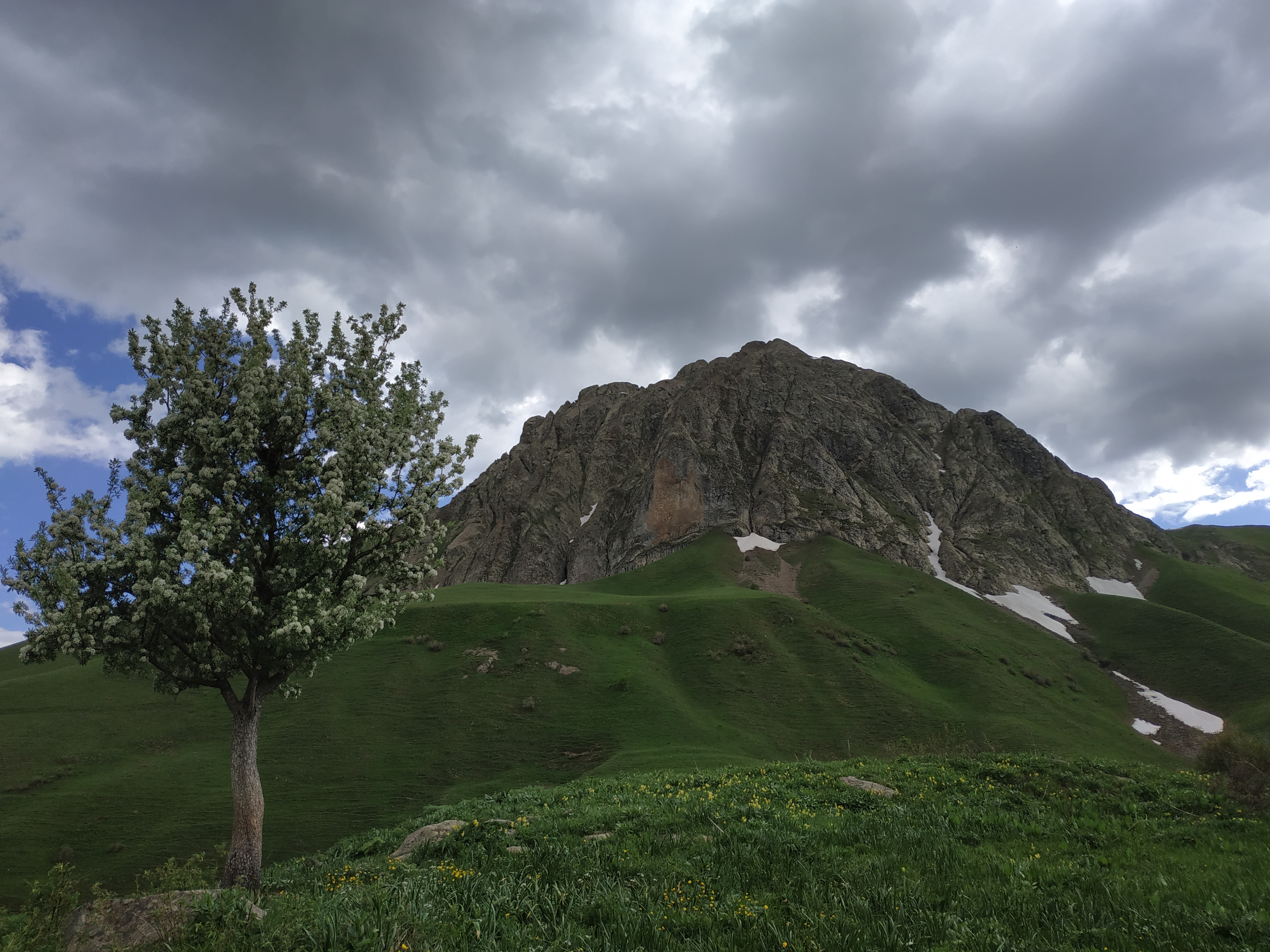

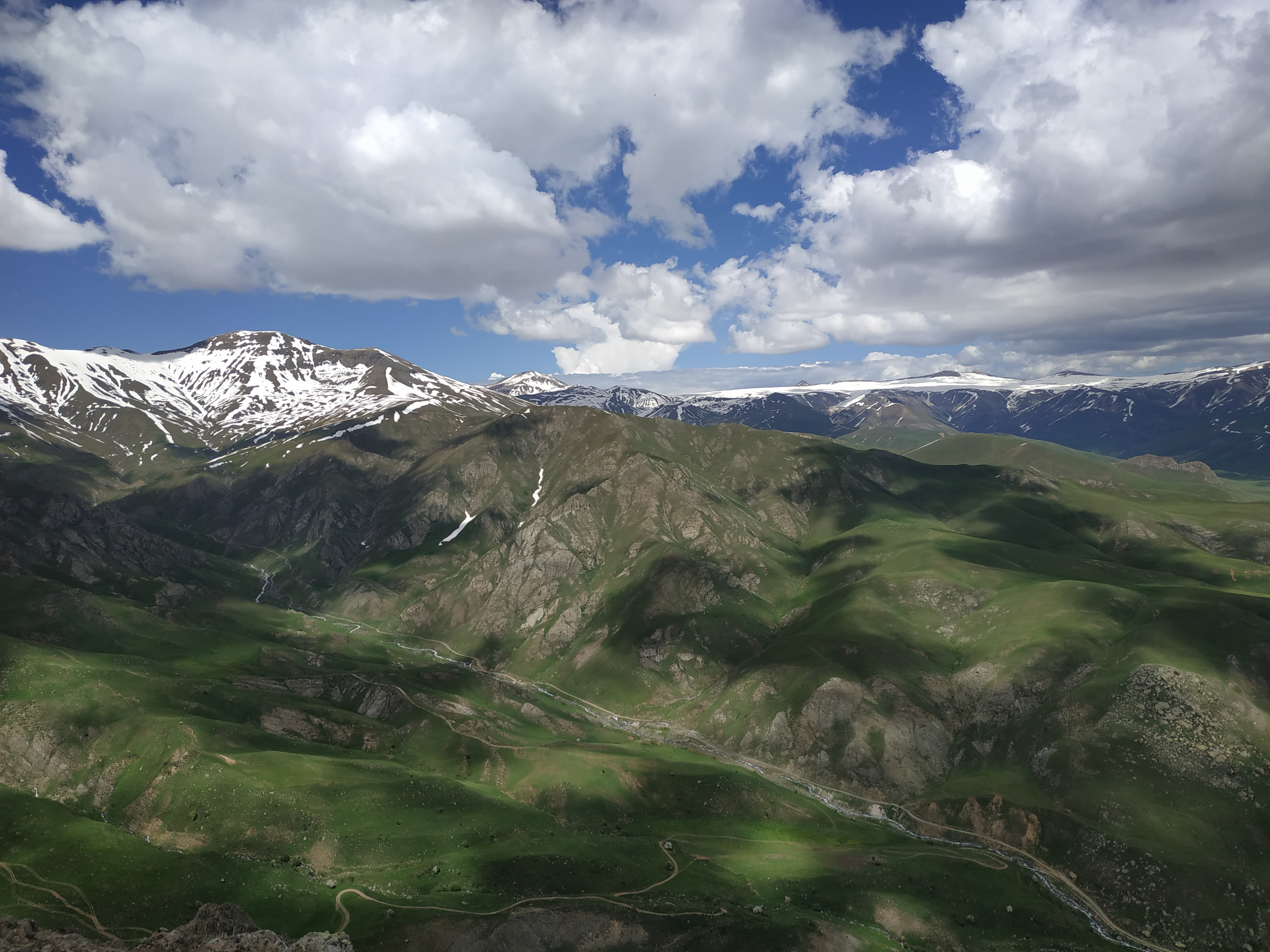
