= Hermann 19 =

Sailboat class

Development
- Designer: Richard P. Ketcham Jr.
- Location: United States
- Year: 1963
- Builder: Ted Hermann's Boat Shop
- Role: Day sailer-Cruiser
- Name: Hermann 19

Boat
- Displacement: 1,000 lb (454 kg)
- Draft: 1.58 ft (0.48 m) with centerboard down

Hull
- Type: monohull
- Construction: fiberglass
- LOA: 18.71 ft (5.70 m)
- LWL: 18.0 ft (5.5 m)
- Beam: 6.42 ft (1.96 m)
- Engine: outboard motor

Hull appendages
- Keel: keel and centerboard
- Ballast: 200 lb (91 kg)
- Rudder: transom-mounted rudder

Rig
- Rig type: Bermuda rig

Sails
- Sailplan: fractional rigged sloop
- Total sail area: 171.00 sq ft (15.886 m^{2})

Racing
- PHRF: 312

The Hermann 19 is an American trailerable sailboat that was designed by Richard P. Ketcham Jr. as a daysailer and pocket cruiser and first built in 1963.

== Production ==
The design was built by Ted Hermann's Boat Shop in Seaford, New York, United States from 1963 until about 1967, but it is now out of production. The company went out of business in about 1978.

== Design ==
The Hermann 19 is a recreational keelboat, built predominantly of fiberglass, with wood trim. It has a fractional sloop rig, a raked stem, an angled transom, a transom-hung rudder controlled by a tiller and a fixed keel and centerboard, or, optionally, centerboard only. It displaces 1,000 lb (454 kg) and carries 200 lb (91 kg) of ballast.

The boat has a draft of 1.58 ft (0.48 m) with the centerboard extended and 9 ft (2.7 m) with it retracted, allowing operation in shallow water, beaching or ground transportation on a trailer.

The boat is normally fitted with a small 3 to 6 hp (2 to 4 kW) outboard motor for docking and maneuvering. The design has sleeping accommodation for two people, with cabin headroom of 42 in (107 cm).

The design has a PHRF racing average handicap of 312 and a hull speed of 5.7 kn (10.6 km/h).

== Operational history ==
In a 2010 review Steve Henkel wrote, "best features: Compared with other boats of her approximate size, weight, and draft, the Hermann 19 has less ballast but more weight in the fiberglass, perhaps making her skin tougher (which is true of other Ted Hermann Boat Shop productions, like the Hermann Cat 17), Very shallow draft with centerboard up, as with her comp[etitor]s, makes her suitable for exploring shoal waters. Worst features: Headroom is relatively low—though a small collapsible dodger in the companionway, as shown in the sailplan, may give some relief to those crouching below."

== See also ==
- List of sailing boat types

Related development

- Hermann 22
