= Vardahovit =

Vardahovit Վարդահովիտ
- Location within Armenia Location within Vayots Dzor
- Coordinates: 39°53′55″N 45°29′01″E
- Country: Armenia
- Province: Vayots Dzor
- Municipality: Yeghegis

Population (2011)
  - Total: 116
- Time zone: UTC+4 (AMT)

Vardahovit (Armenian: Վարդահովիտ) is a village in the Yeghegis Municipality of the Vayots Dzor Province in Armenia.
