= Taratumb =

Taratumb Թառաթումբ
- Location within Armenia Location within Vayots Dzor
- Coordinates: 39°53′29″N 45°15′03″E
- Country: Armenia
- Province: Vayots Dzor
- Municipality: Yeghegis

Population (2011)
  - Total: 448
- Time zone: UTC+4 (AMT)

Taratumb (Armenian: Թառաթումբ) is a village in the Yeghegis Municipality of the Vayots Dzor Province in Armenia.
