= Heermann =

Heermann may refer to:

== People with the surname ==
- Adolphus Lewis Heermann (1821–1865), American doctor, naturalist, ornithologist, and explorer
- Hugo Heermann (1844–1935), German violinist
- Johann Heermann (1585–1647), German poet and hymn-writer
- Johann Heermann (politician) (1897–1976), German politician
- Lewis Heermann (1779–1833), German, commissioned Surgeon's Mate in the United States Navy in 1802

== Other ==
- USS Heermann (DD-532), a World War II-era Fletcher-class destroyer in the United States Navy

== See also ==
- Heermann's gull (Larus heermanni), a gull resident in the United States, Mexico and British Columbia
- Heermann's kangaroo rat, (Dipodomys heermanni), a species of rodent in the family Heteromyidae
- Hermann (disambiguation)
