= Hermann (crater) =

Crater on the Moon

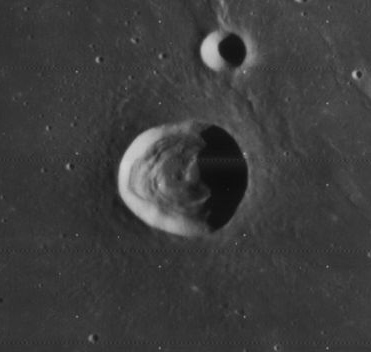
- Lunar Orbiter 4 image of Hermann (center) and Hermann B (above right)
- Coordinates: 0.9°S 57.3°W
- Diameter: 16 km
- Depth: 1.4 km
- Colongitude: 57° at sunrise
- Eponym: Jacob Hermann

Hermann is a small lunar impact crater that is located in the western Oceanus Procellarum, just over one crater diameter to the south of the Moon's equator. It is a solitary crater with only a few tiny craterlets and some low wrinkle ridges nearby.

The interior floor of this crater has been flooded with lava, leaving a dark surface with the same albedo as the surrounding lunar mare. Only a low, nearly circular rim projects above the surface, which is not significantly eroded. The rim has a slight outward bulge on the western rim.

== Satellite craters ==
By convention these features are identified on lunar maps by placing the letter on the side of the crater midpoint that is closest to Hermann.

Hermann	Latitude	Longitude	Diameter
A	0.4° N	58.2° W	4 km
B	0.3° S	57.1° W	5 km
C	0.2° S	60.6° W	3 km
D	2.3° S	54.0° W	3 km
E	0.1° N	52.0° W	4 km
F	1.3° N	55.4° W	3 km
H	0.9° N	61.8° W	4 km
J	2.6° N	57.4° W	4 km
K	2.4° N	58.3° W	3 km
L	2.4° N	59.1° W	3 km
R	0.6° N	55.6° W	3 km
S	1.0° N	55.5° W	4 km
