= Hermann 22 =

Sailboat class

Development
- Designer: Richard P. Ketcham Jr.
- Location: United States
- Year: 1961
- Builder: Ted Hermann's Boat Shop
- Role: Cruiser

Boat
- Displacement: 4,500 lb (2,041 kg)
- Draft: 4.00 ft (1.22 m) with the centerboard down

Hull
- Type: monohull
- Construction: fiberglass
- LOA: 22.00 ft (6.71 m)
- LWL: 20.00 ft (6.10 m)
- Beam: 9.50 ft (2.90 m)
- Engine: Palmer 8 hp (6 kW) inboard engine

Hull appendages
- Keel: stub long keel and centerboard
- Ballast: 300 lb (136 kg)
- Rudder: transom-mounted rudder

Rig
- Rig type: Bermuda rig

Sails
- Sailplan: masthead sloop
- Total sail area: 270.00 sq ft (25.084 m^{2})

The Hermann 22, also called the Hermann 20 for its waterline length, is an American trailerable sailboat that was designed by Richard P. Ketcham Jr. as a cruiser and first built in 1961.

== Production ==
The design was built by Ted Hermann's Boat Shop in Seaford, New York, United States from 1961 until about 1967, but it is now out of production.

== Design ==
The Hermann 22 is a recreational keelboat, built predominantly of fiberglass, with extensive wood trim, including wooden cockpit coamings. It has a masthead sloop rig, a slightly raked stem, an angled transom, a short transom-hung rudder controlled by a tiller and a fixed stub long fin keel with a centerboard. It displaces 4,500 lb (2,041 kg) and carries 300 lb (136 kg) of ballast.

The boat has a draft of 4.00 ft (1.22 m) with the centerboard extended and 2.00 ft (0.61 m) with it retracted, allowing operation in shallow water or ground transportation on a trailer.

The boat is fitted with a Palmer inboard engine of 8 hp (6 kW) for docking and maneuvering. The fuel tank holds 10 U.S. gallons (38 L; 8.3 imp gal) and the fresh water tank has a capacity of 15 U.S. gallons (57 L; 12 imp gal).

The design has sleeping accommodation for four people, with a double "V"-berth in the bow cabin and two straight settee quarter berths in the main cabin. The galley is located centered under the companionway ladder, which lowers to use the galley. The galley is equipped with a two-burner stove and a sink. The head is located just aft of the bow cabin on the port side. Cabin headroom is 52 in (132 cm).

The design has a hull speed of 6.0 kn (11.1 km/h).

== Operational history ==
In a 2010 review Steve Henkel wrote, "here is a masthead sloop with a hull almost as wide (9 1/2 feet) and as heavy as a typical Cape God Catboat. She was the first fiberglass cruising sailboat built by Ted Hermann, at his Seaford Harbor, Long Island Boat Shop, way back at the beginning of the fiberglass era. Best features: She looks like a trim, prim, and wholesome product of the early 1960s, which is exactly what she is—and among her comp[etitor]s may take the Beauty Prize (though the Cornish Crabber is likely to give her a run for her money in the beauty department). Her large cockpit can handle a sizable crowd for daysailing. And with her shallow draft and smooth bottom, we can see her skipper dropping off the crowd and then putt-putting up to some tranquil gunkhole to anchor for the night. Worst features: Her rudder looks more like one sized for a powerboat than a sailboat, and maybe that's how she'd end up being used most of the time, since a sail area of only 270 square feet isn't going to move her wide, heavy hull very fast, at least in light air...."

== See also ==
- List of sailing boat types

Related development

- Hermann 19
