= Salli, Armenia =

Salli Սալլի
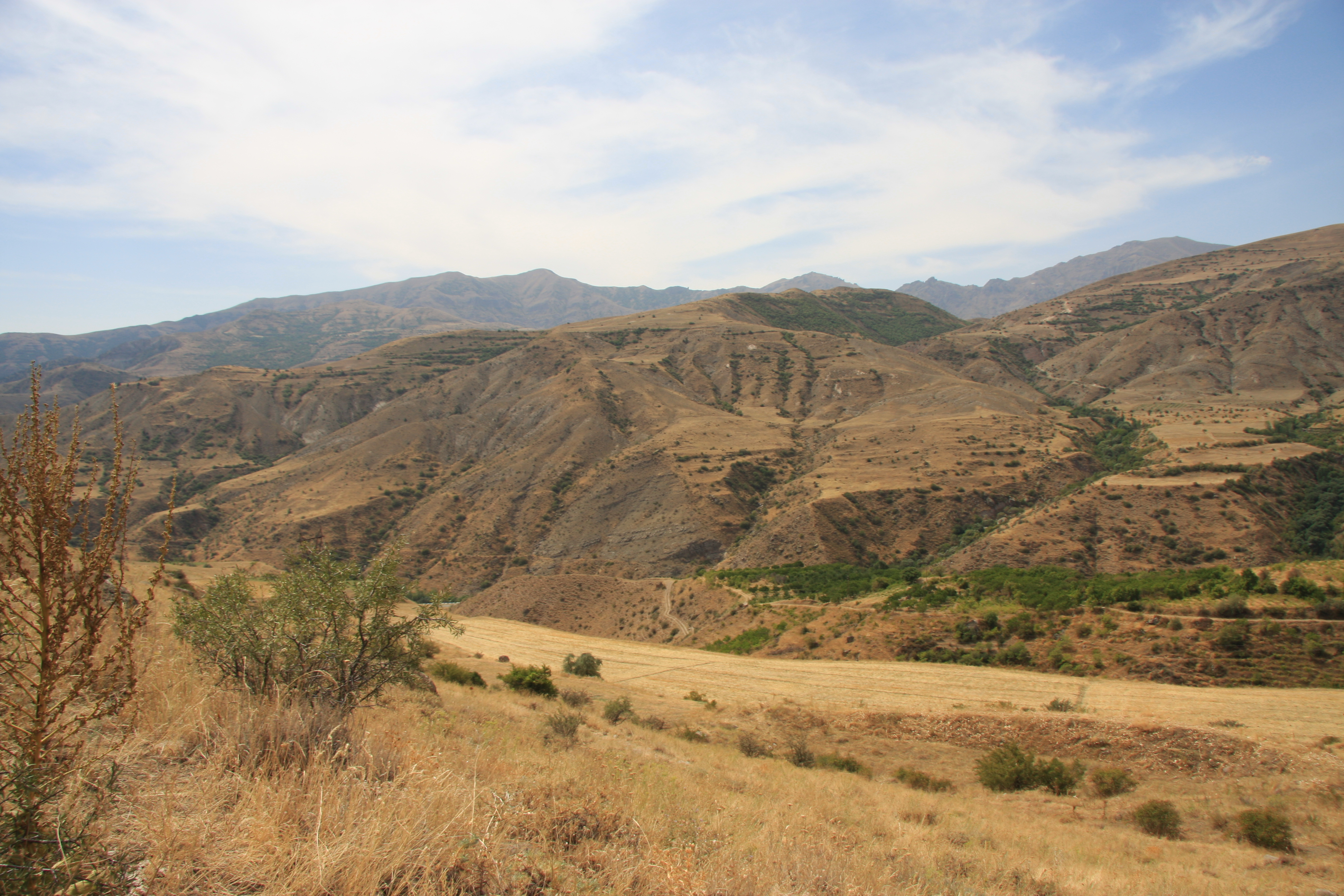

- Location within Armenia Location within Vayots Dzor
- Coordinates: 39°52′25″N 45°16′36″E
- Country: Armenia
- Province: Vayots Dzor
- Municipality: Yeghegis

Population (2011)
  - Total: 220
- Time zone: UTC+4 (AMT)

Salli (Armenian: Սալլի) is a village in the Yeghegis Municipality of the Vayots Dzor Province in Armenia.

== Gallery ==
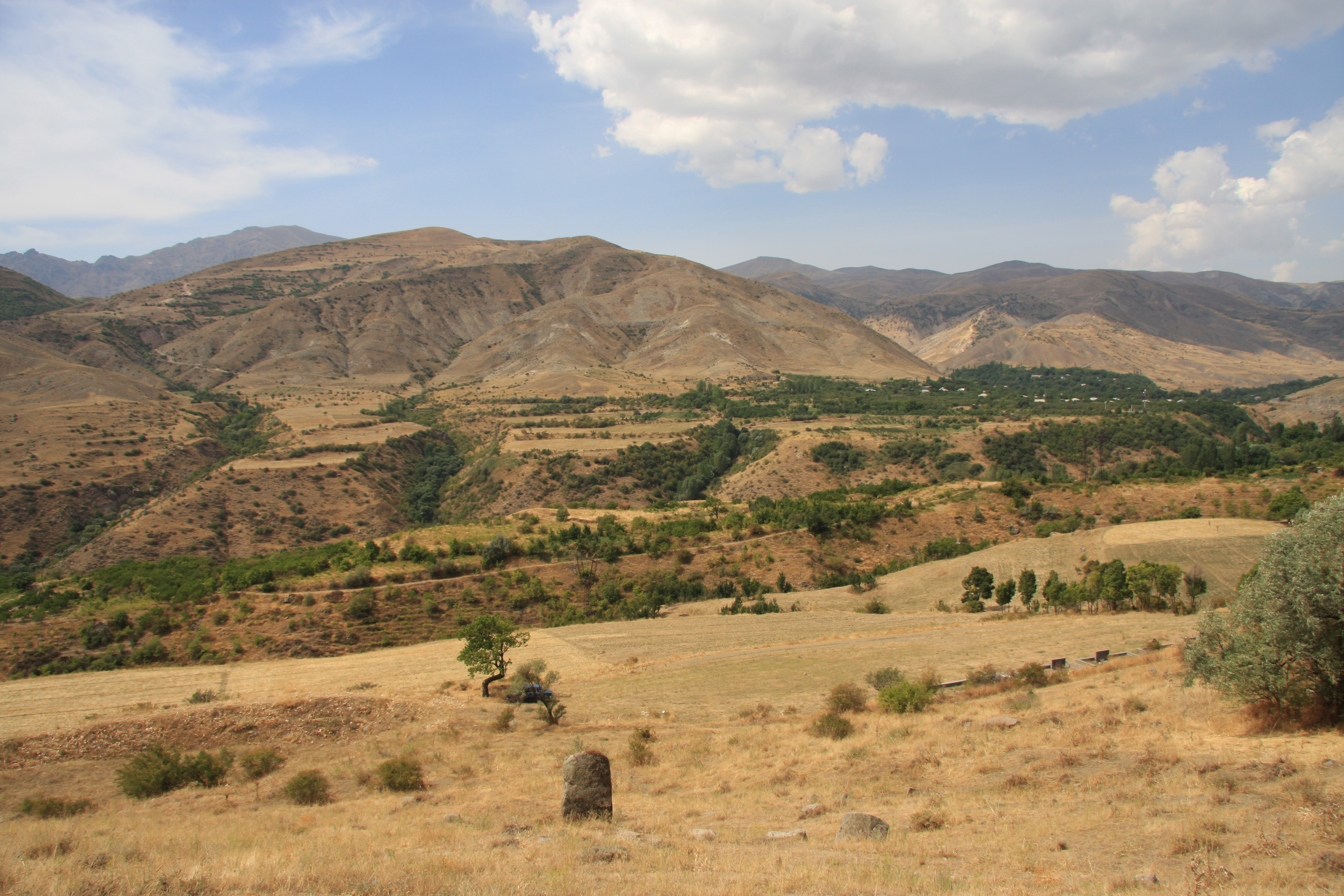
Scenery around Salli

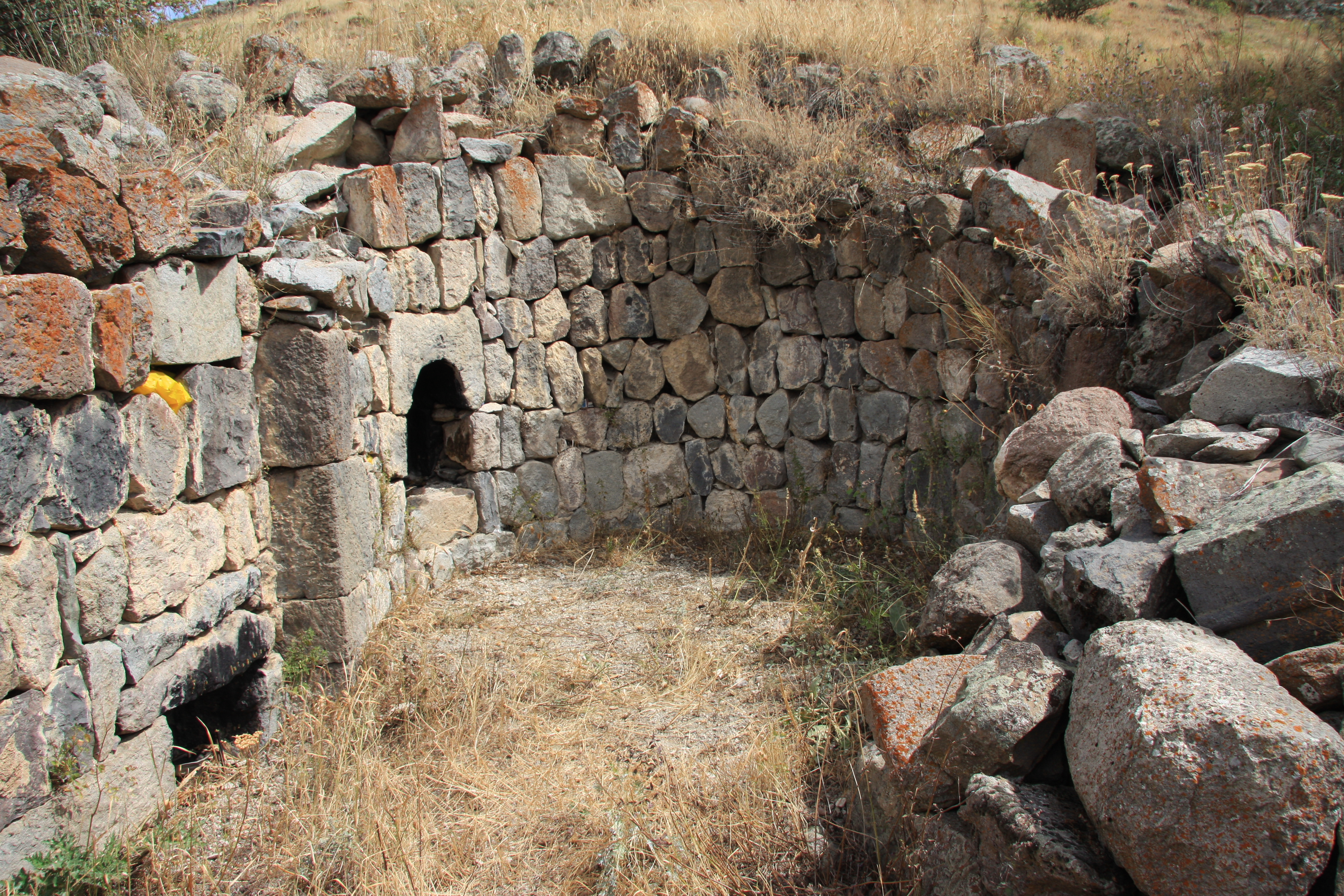
Saint Mamas Monastery in Salli

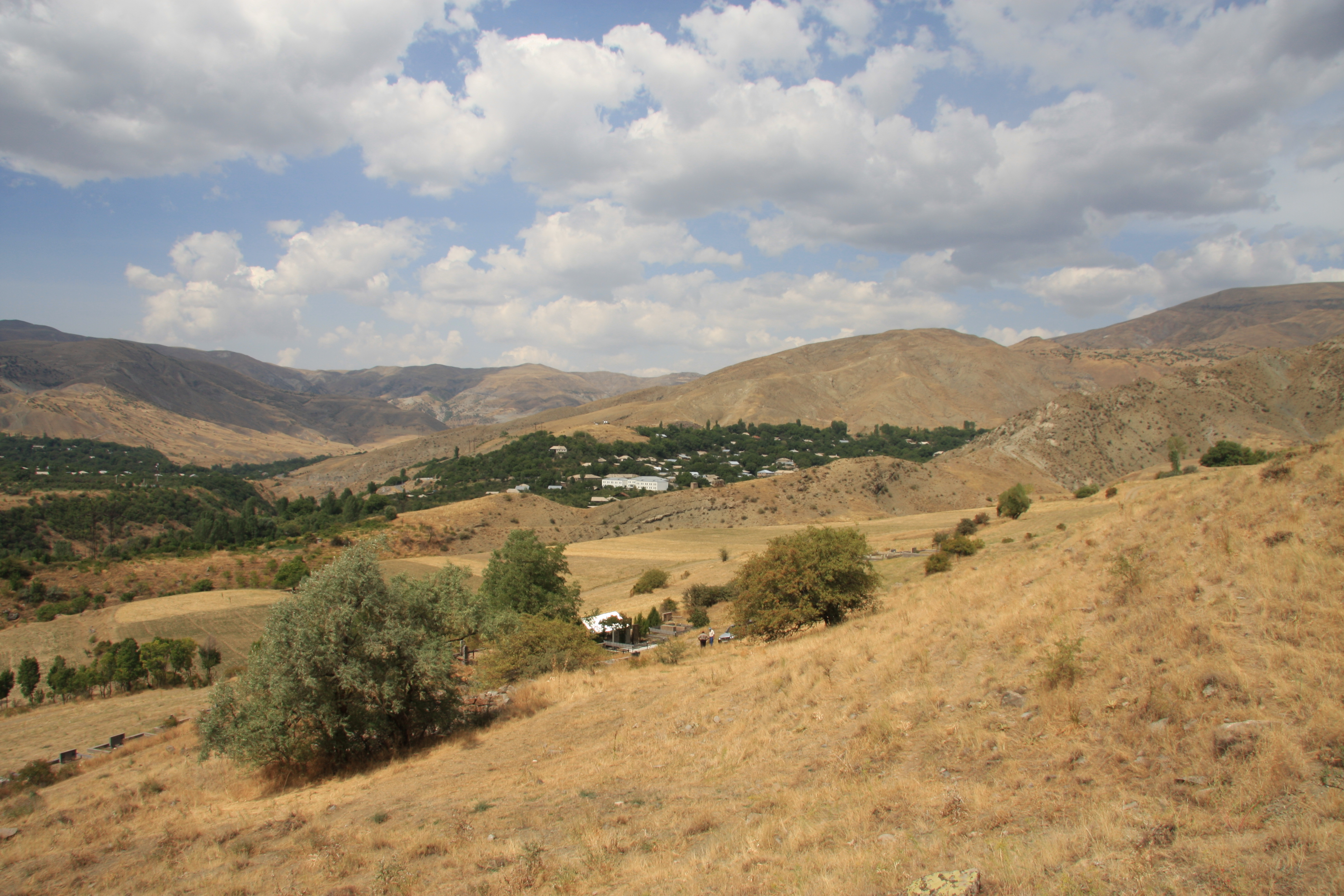
Scenery around Salli
