= Shatin, Armenia =

Shatin Շատին
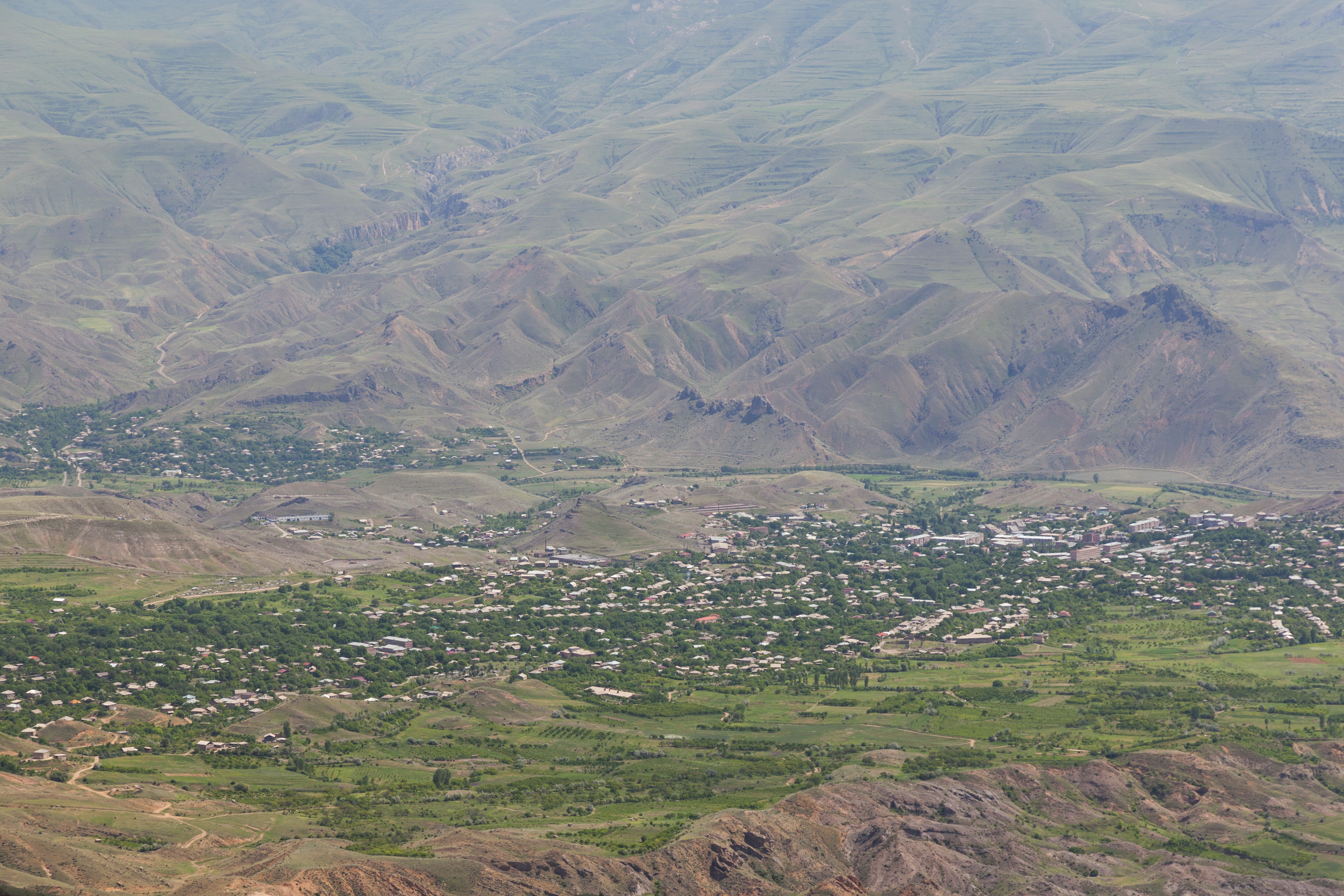

- Location within Armenia Location within Vayots Dzor
- Coordinates: 39°50′00″N 45°18′06″E
- Country: Armenia
- Province: Vayots Dzor
- Municipality: Yeghegis

Population (2011)
  - Total: 1,736
- Time zone: UTC+4 (AMT)

Shatin (Armenian: Շատին) is a village and the centre of the Yeghegis Municipality of the Vayots Dzor Province in Armenia. The village contains several archeological sites from various periods in Armenian history.

== Toponymy ==
The village was previously known as Shatik, Hesan Kand, Gasankend and Hasankand.

== Nature ==
The village is home to the only mountain goat observation point in Armenia. The observation point was constructed with the help of the Norwegian and Armenian governments, the World Wildlife Fund and Safari organisations.

== Gallery ==
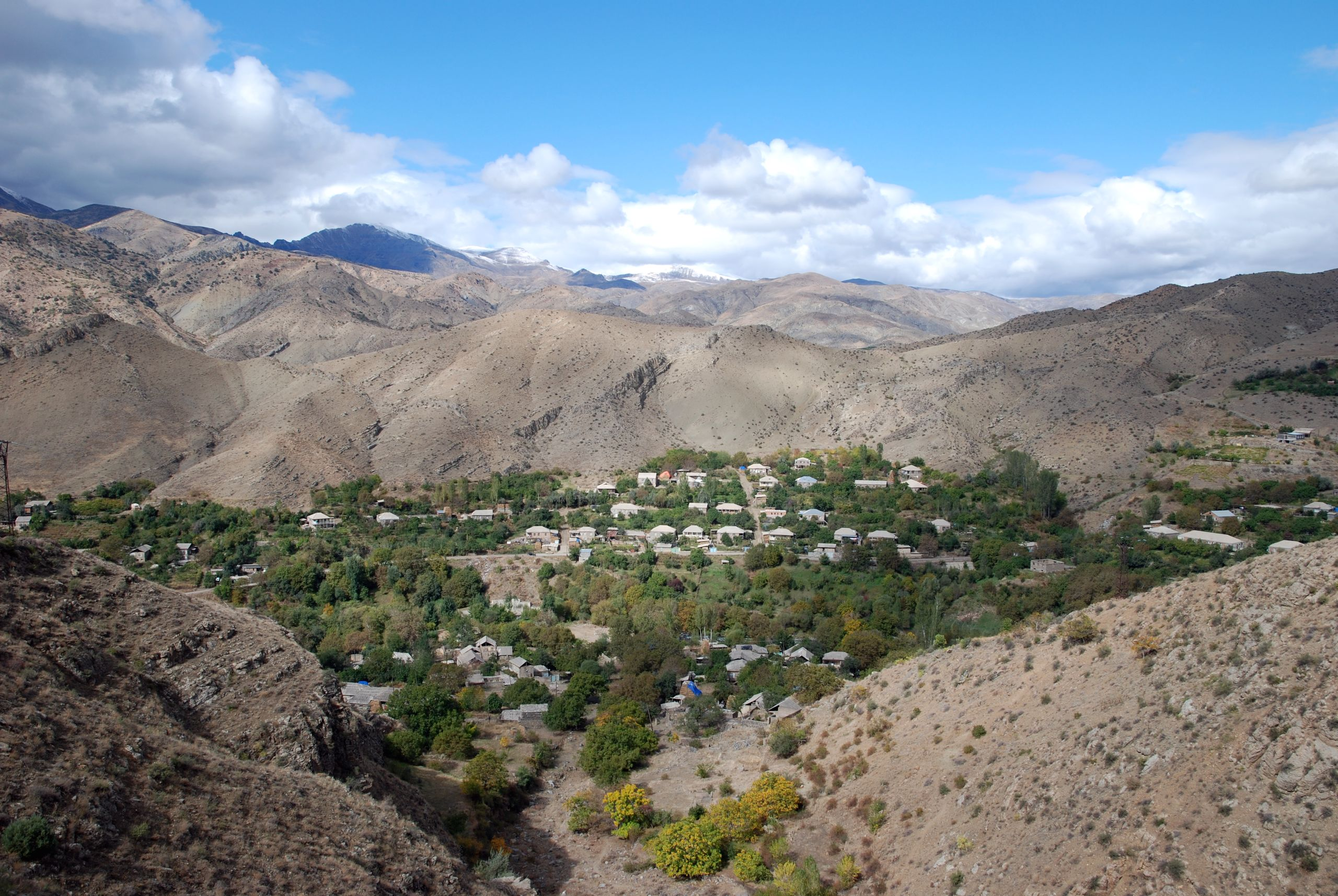
A view of the village

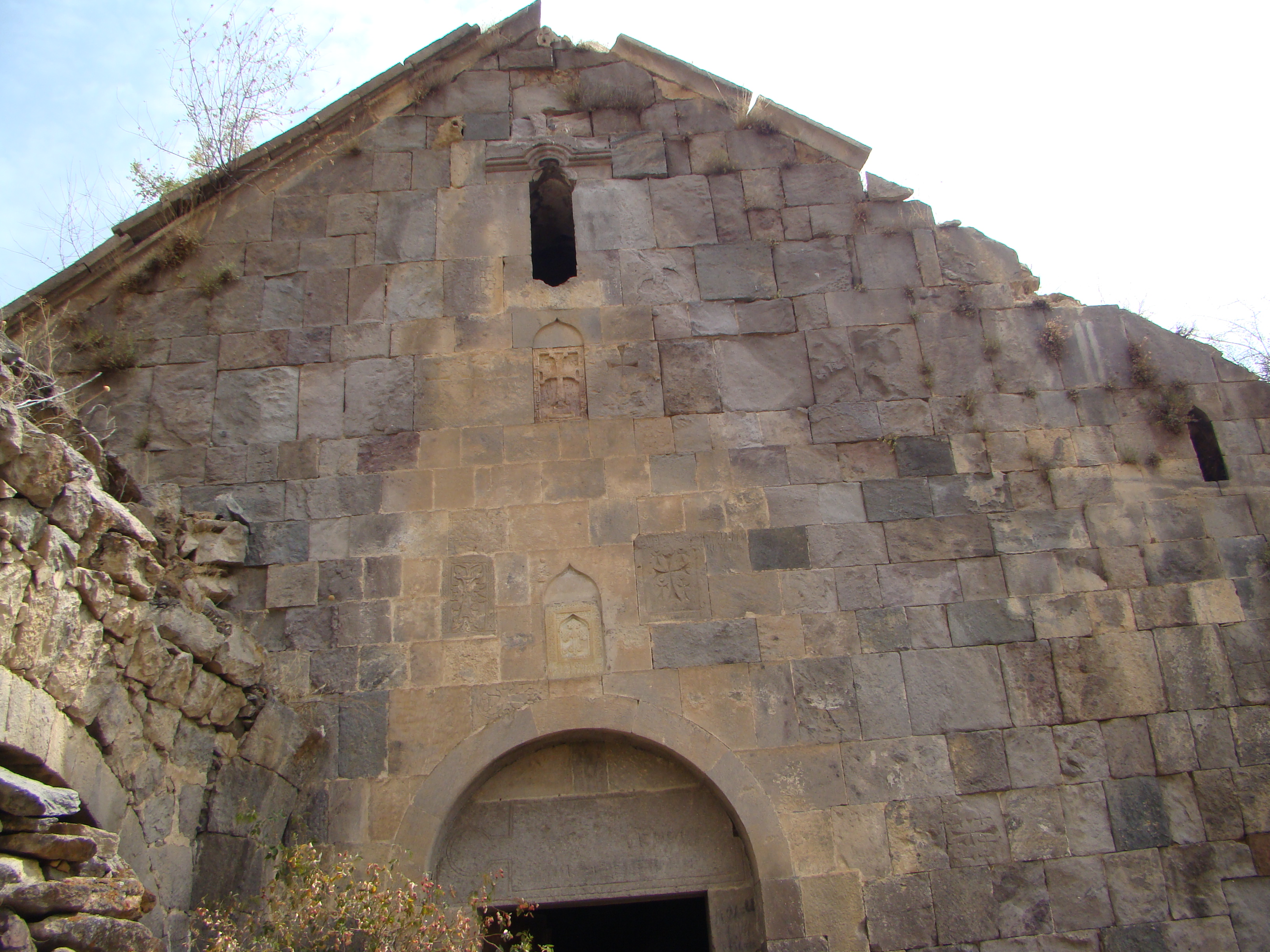
Shativank

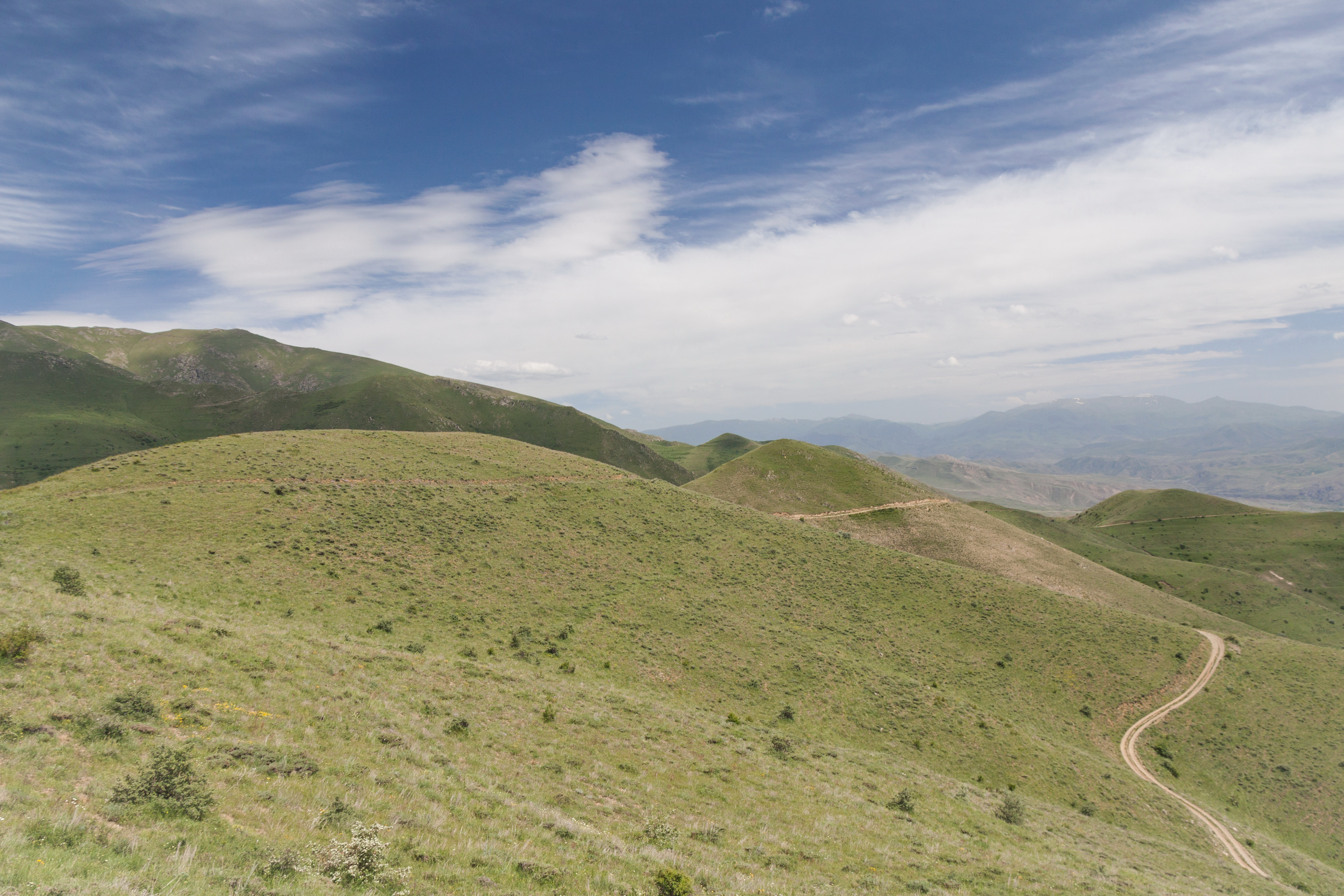
Scenery around Shatin

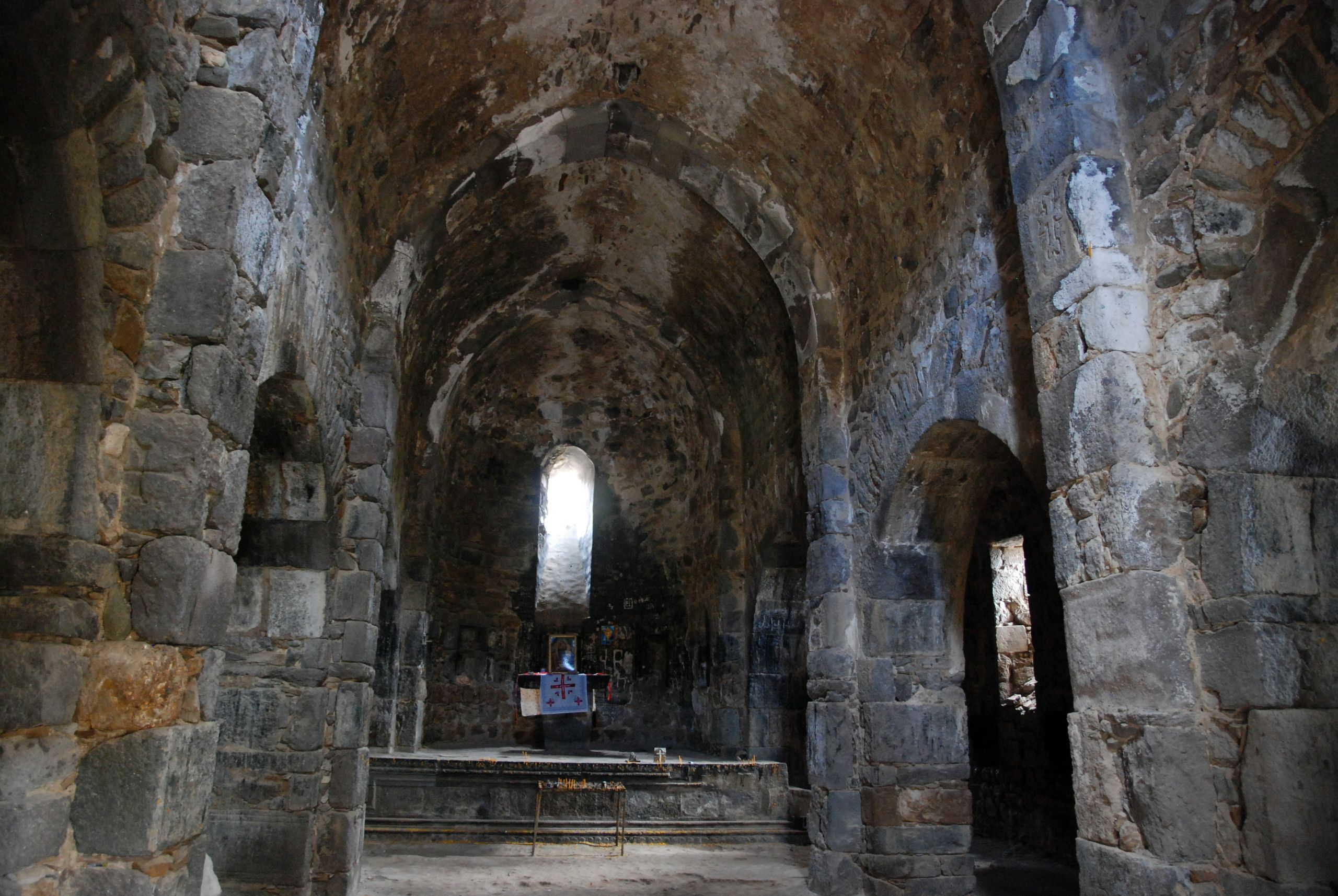
Shativank interior

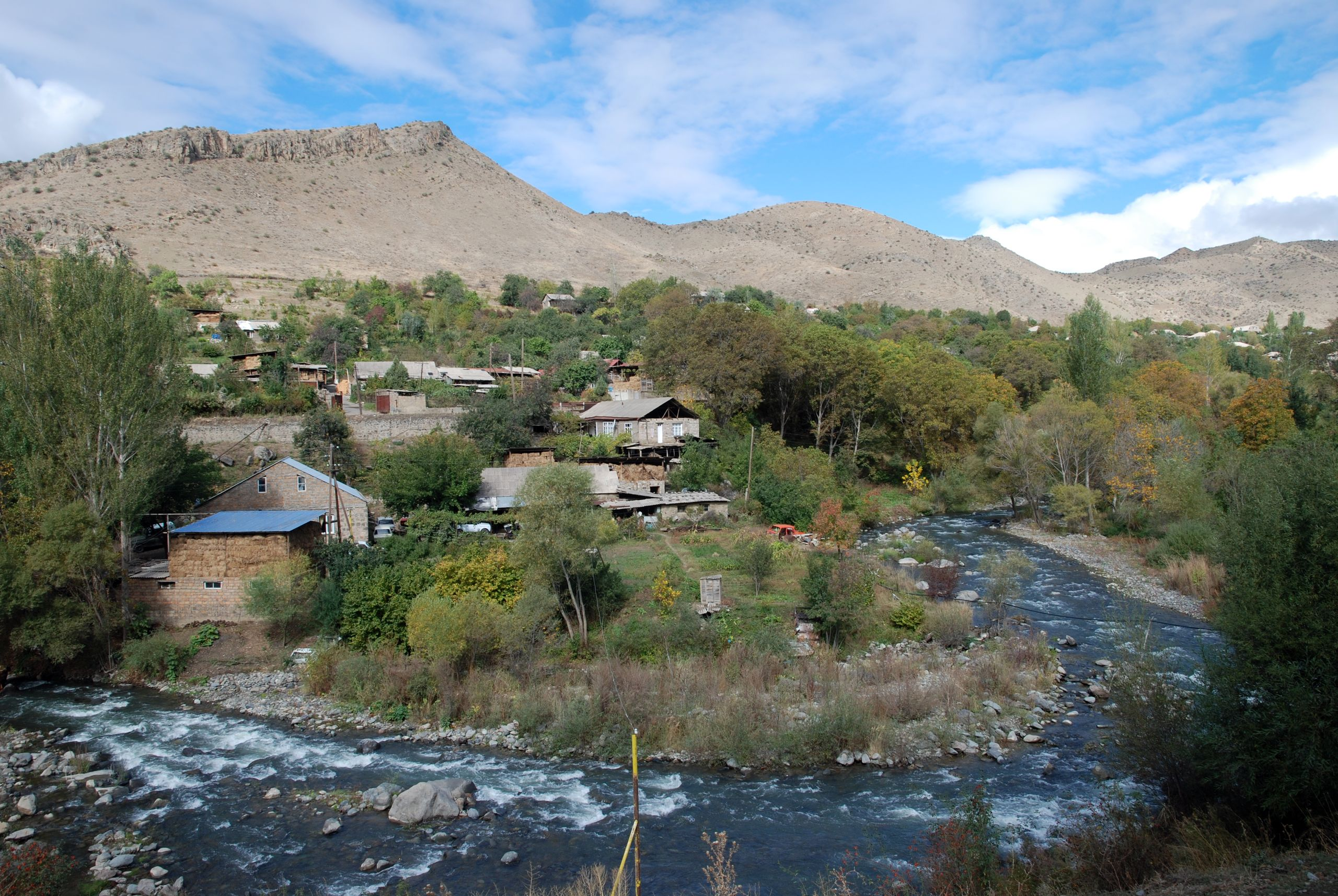
A view of the village

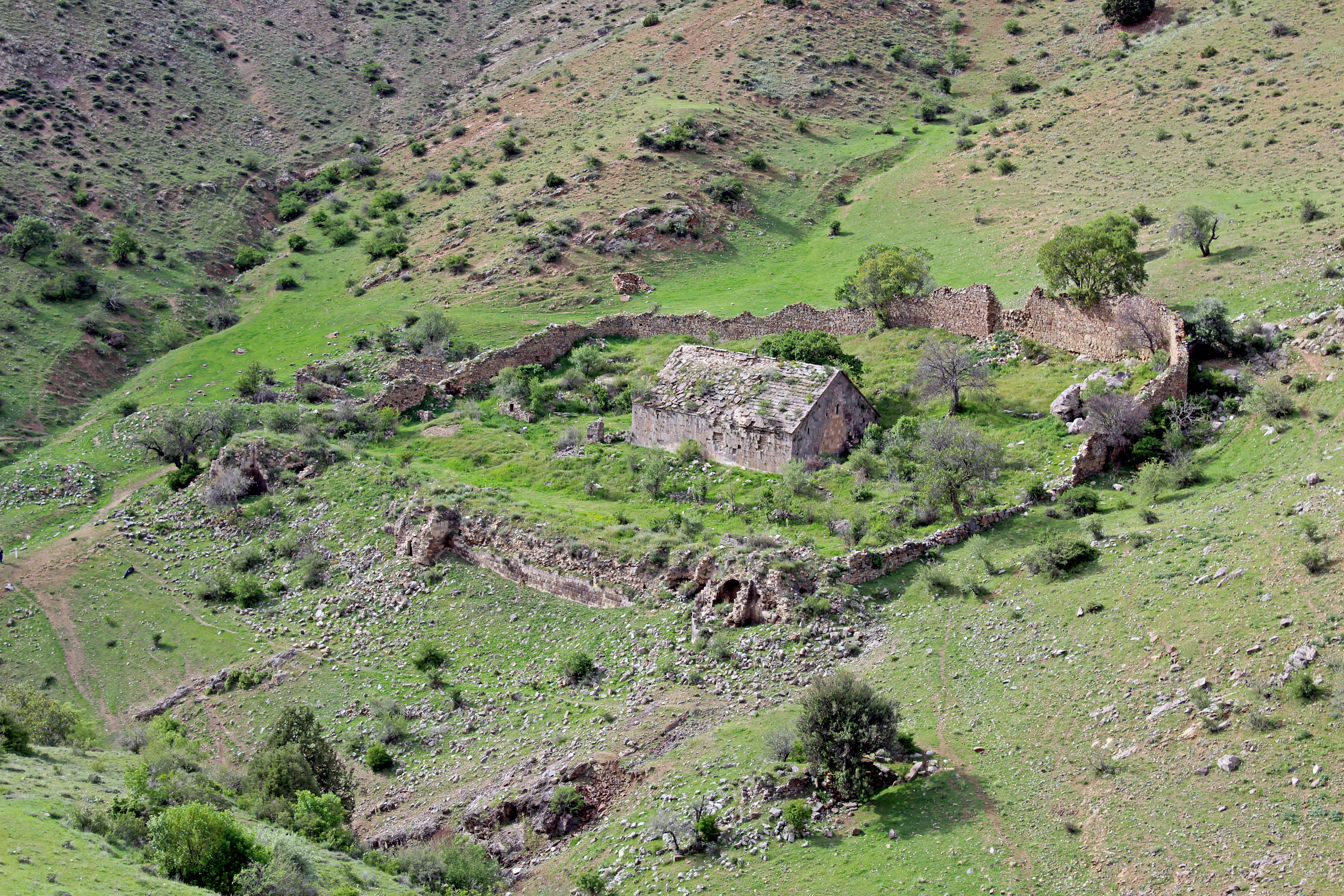
Shativank
