= Derek Hermon =

American cyclist and bike manufacturer

Derek Hermon is an American professional BMX racer, mountain biker, and bike manufacturer. Hermon's career spans many decades and has won him a number of honors.

Today, Hermon is seen as a leader of the cycling community, especially in the Southern California region. He is a member of the USA Cycling board of trustees and continues to race professionally. Hermon is owner of Bear Valley Bikes and founder of Speed Evolution, a company that manufactures cycling products and mechanically enhances bike performance.

== Career ==
=== BMX racing ===
Derek Hermon began his cycling career as a BMX racer in the 1980s. He currently races professionally in XC, Super-D, CycloCross and Downhill, and was inducted into the Big Bear Mt. Bike Hall of Fame in 2008. Hermon became president of Team Bear Valley Bikes in 2000 and led them to win the Rim Nordic Series “team of the decade” in 2010.

=== Bike manufacturing ===
Hermon also had a role in the manufacturing side of the cycling industry with Racefit data acquisition systems and then Hanebrink bicycles by helping to develop and test products that contributed to the evolution of the sport and its technological advancement. Hermon was on the USA Cycling board of trustees and is dedicated to the progression of the sport. He is the founder of Speed-Evolution, a bicycle component manufacturer.
