= Hermon, Armenia =

Hermon Հերմոն
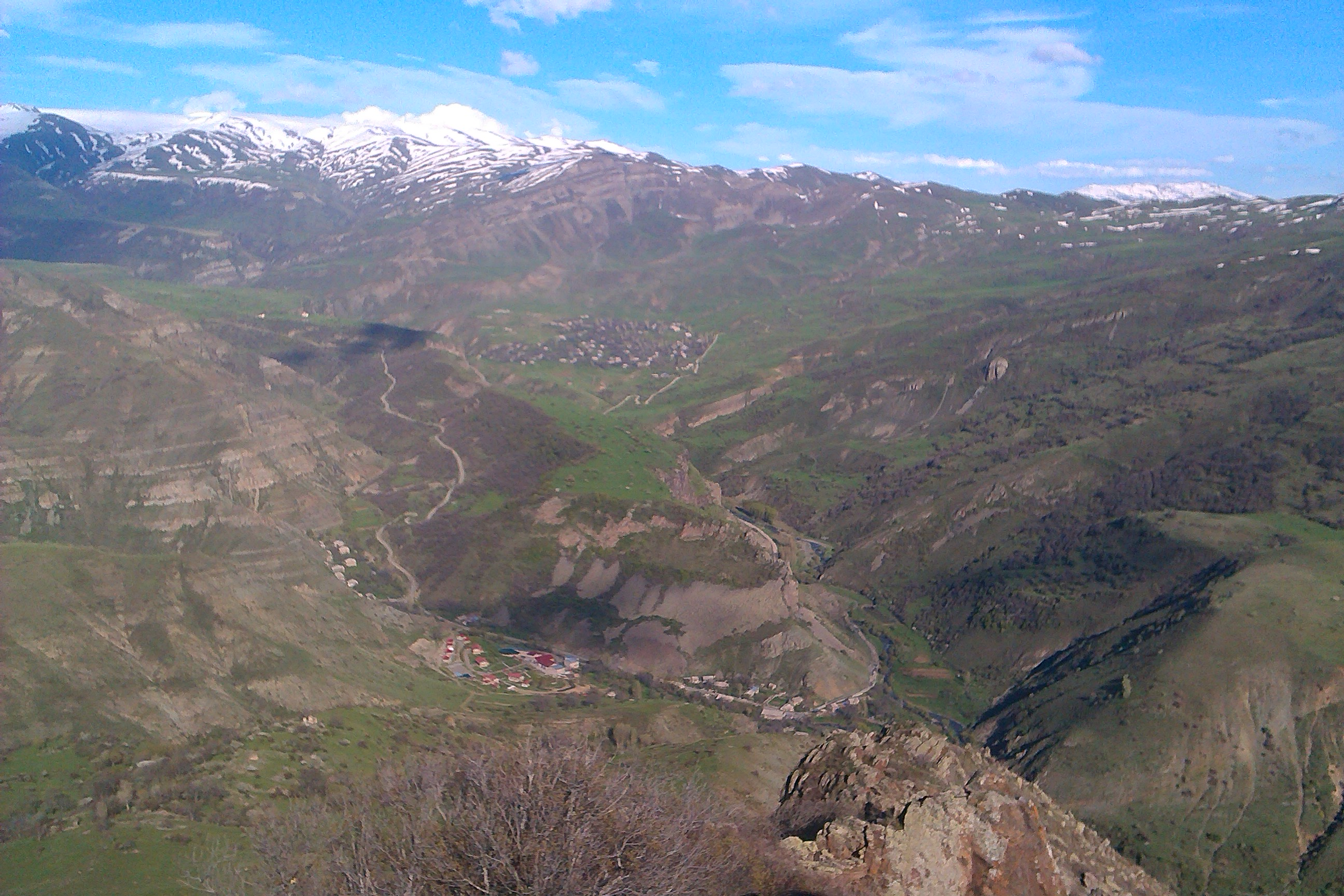
- Hermon (foreground) and Goghtanik (background)

- Location within Armenia Location within Vayots Dzor
- Coordinates: 39°52′46″N 45°25′35″E
- Country: Armenia
- Province: Vayots Dzor
- Municipality: Yeghegis

Population (2011)
  - Total: 180
- Time zone: UTC+4 (AMT)

Hermon (Armenian: Հերմոն) is a village in the Yeghegis Municipality of the Vayots Dzor Province in Armenia.
