= Herman =

Herman may refer to:

== People ==
- Herman (name), list of people with this name
- Saint Herman (disambiguation)
- Peter Noone (born 1947), known by the mononym Herman

== Places in the United States ==
- Herman, Arkansas
- Herman, Michigan
- Herman, Minnesota
- Herman, Nebraska
- Herman, Pennsylvania
- Herman, Dodge County, Wisconsin
- Herman, Shawano County, Wisconsin
- Herman, Sheboygan County, Wisconsin

== Place in India ==
- Herman, Shopian

== Other uses ==
- Heřmaň (disambiguation), places in the Czech Republic
- Herman (comic strip)
- Herman (film), a 1990 Norwegian film
- Herman Building, a historic building in Hollywood, California
- Herman the Bull, a bull used for genetic experiments in the controversial lactoferrin project of GenePharming, Netherlands
- Herman the Clown (Finnish: Pelle Hermanni), a Finnish TV clown from children's TV show performed by Veijo Pasanen
- Herman's Hermits, a British pop combo
- Herman cake (also called Hermann), a type of sourdough bread starter or Amish Friendship Bread starter
- Herman (album) by 't Hof Van Commerce

== See also ==
- Hermann (disambiguation)
- Arman (name)
- Armand (disambiguation)
- Germanus (disambiguation)
- Germán
- Germain (disambiguation)
