= Ludwigslust (district) =

Coordinates: 53°20′N 11°15′E

- District
- Flag Coat of arms

- Country: Germany
- State: Mecklenburg-Vorpommern
- Disbanded: 2011
- Capital: Ludwigslust

Area
  - Total: 2,517 km^{2} (972 sq mi)

Population (2010-12-31)
  - Total: 122,564
  - Density: 48.69/km^{2} (126.1/sq mi)
- Time zone: UTC+01:00 (CET)
  - Summer (DST): UTC+02:00 (CEST)
- Vehicle registration: LWL
- Website: kreis-lwl.de

Ludwigslust is a former Kreis (district) in the southwest of Mecklenburg-Vorpommern, Germany. Neighboring districts were (from the north clockwise) Nordwestmecklenburg, the district-free city Schwerin, Parchim, Prignitz in Brandenburg, Lüchow-Dannenberg and Lüneburg in Lower Saxony and the district Lauenburg in Schleswig-Holstein. The district was disbanded at the district reform of September 2011. Its territory has been part of the Ludwigslust-Parchim district since.

== Geography ==
The district was situated roughly between the river Elbe and the city of Schwerin. Before the 2011 district reform, it was the largest district of Mecklenburg-Vorpommern, but very sparsely populated.

== History ==
After the German reunification the two districts of Hagenow and Ludwigslust were established. In 1994 both together, with the two Ämter of Rastow and Stralendorf from the district of Schwerin-Land, were merged to an enlarged district of Ludwigslust. This district was merged with the district of Parchim at the district reform of September 2011, forming the new Ludwigslust-Parchim district.

== Coat of arms ==
| The coat of arms shows a horse in the top, referring to the horse breeding station in Redefin as well as the tradition of horse breeding in the area in general. The Counts of Schwerin also used a horse as their symbol. The wavy line separating the bottom symbolizes the river Elbe. The three oak leaves in the bottom stand for the three districts which were merged to make up today's district. The colors derive from two historic counties - red-yellow from the county of Schwerin and red-silver-green from the county Dannenberg. |

== Towns and municipalities ==
The subdivisions of the district were (situation August 2011):

Amt-free towns
1. Boizenburg
2. Hagenow
3. Lübtheen
4. Ludwigslust

Ämter
| 1. Boizenburg-Land [seat: Boizenburg]; 1. Bengerstorf; 2. Besitz; 3. Brahlstorf; 4. Dersenow; 5. Gresse; 6. Greven; 7. Neu Gülze; 8. Nostorf; 9. Schwanheide; 10. Teldau; 11. Tessin bei Boizenburg; 2. Dömitz-Malliß; 1. Dömitz^{1, 2}; 2. Grebs-Niendorf; 3. Karenz; 4. Malk Göhren; 5. Malliß; 6. Neu Kaliß; 7. Vielank; 3. Grabow; 1. Balow; 2. Brunow; 3. Dambeck; 4. Eldena; 5. Gorlosen; 6. Grabow^{1, 2}; 7. Karstädt; 8. Kremmin; 9. Milow; 10. Möllenbeck; 11. Muchow; 12. Prislich; 13. Steesow^{3}; 14. Zierzow | 4. Hagenow-Land [seat: Hagenow]; 1. Alt Zachun; 2. Bandenitz; 3. Belsch; 4. Bobzin; 5. Bresegard bei Picher; 6. Gammelin; 7. Groß Krams; 8. Hoort; 9. Hülseburg; 10. Kirch Jesar; 11. Kuhstorf; 12. Moraas; 13. Pätow-Steegen; 14. Picher; 15. Pritzier; 16. Redefin; 17. Setzin; 18. Strohkirchen; 19. Toddin; 20. Warlitz; 5. Ludwigslust-Land [seat: Ludwigslust]; 1. Alt Krenzlin; 2. Bresegard bei Eldena; 3. Göhlen; 4. Groß Laasch; 5. Leussow; 6. Lübesse; 7. Lüblow; 8. Rastow; 9. Sülstorf; 10. Uelitz; 11. Warlow; 12. Wöbbelin | 6. Neustadt-Glewe; 1. Blievenstorf; 2. Brenz; 3. Neustadt-Glewe^{1, 2}; 7. Stralendorf; 1. Dümmer; 2. Holthusen; 3. Klein Rogahn; 4. Pampow; 5. Schossin; 6. Stralendorf^{1}; 7. Warsow; 8. Wittenförden; 9. Zülow; 8. Wittenburg; 1. Körchow^{3}; 2. Lehsen^{3}; 3. Wittenburg^{1, 2}; 4. Wittendörp; 9. Zarrentin; 1. Gallin; 2. Kogel; 3. Lüttow-Valluhn; 4. Vellahn; 5. Zarrentin^{1, 2} |
^{1} - seat of the Amt; ^{2} - town; ^{3} - former town/municipality
