= Barniner See =

Lake in Mecklenburg-Vorpommern, Germany

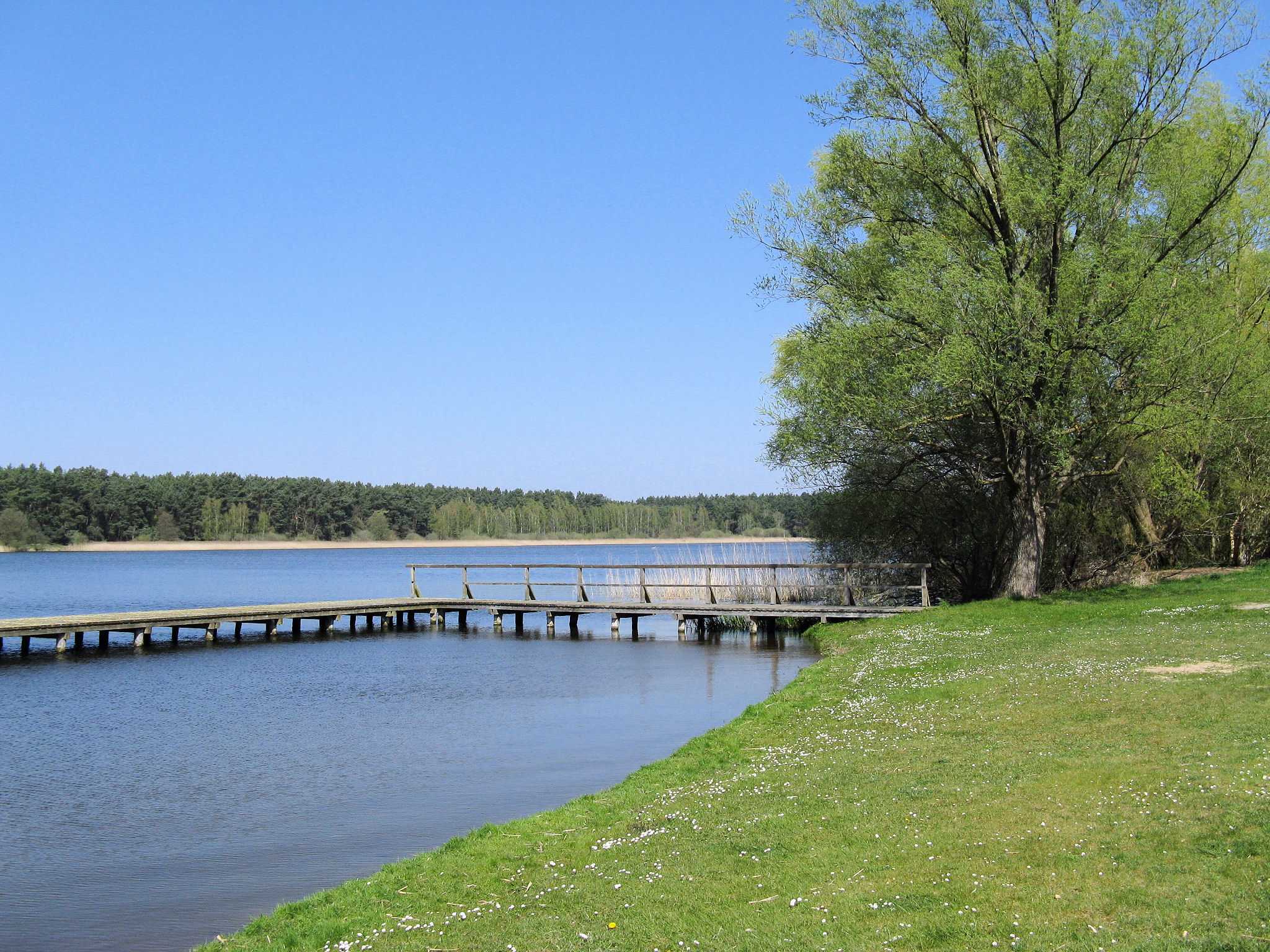

- Location within Mecklenburg-Vorpommern
- Location: Ludwigslust-Parchim, Mecklenburg-Vorpommern
- Coordinates: 53°36′30″N 11°42′21″E
- Primary inflows: Warnow, Amtsgraben
- Primary outflows: Warnow
- Basin countries: Germany
- Max. length: 3.17 km (1.97 mi)
- Max. width: 1.19 km (0.74 mi)
- Surface area: 2.55 km^{2} (0.98 sq mi)
- Average depth: 2.1 m (6 ft 11 in)
- Max. depth: 7.5 m (25 ft)
- Water volume: 5,430,000 m^{3} (192,000,000 cu ft)
- Shore length^{1}: 11.3 km (7.0 mi)
- Surface elevation: 36.3 m (119 ft)
- ^{1} Shore length is not a well-defined measure.

Barniner See is a lake in Ludwigslust-Parchim, Mecklenburg-Vorpommern, Germany. At an elevation of 36.3 m, its surface area is 2.55 km².
