= Groß Krams =

- Municipality
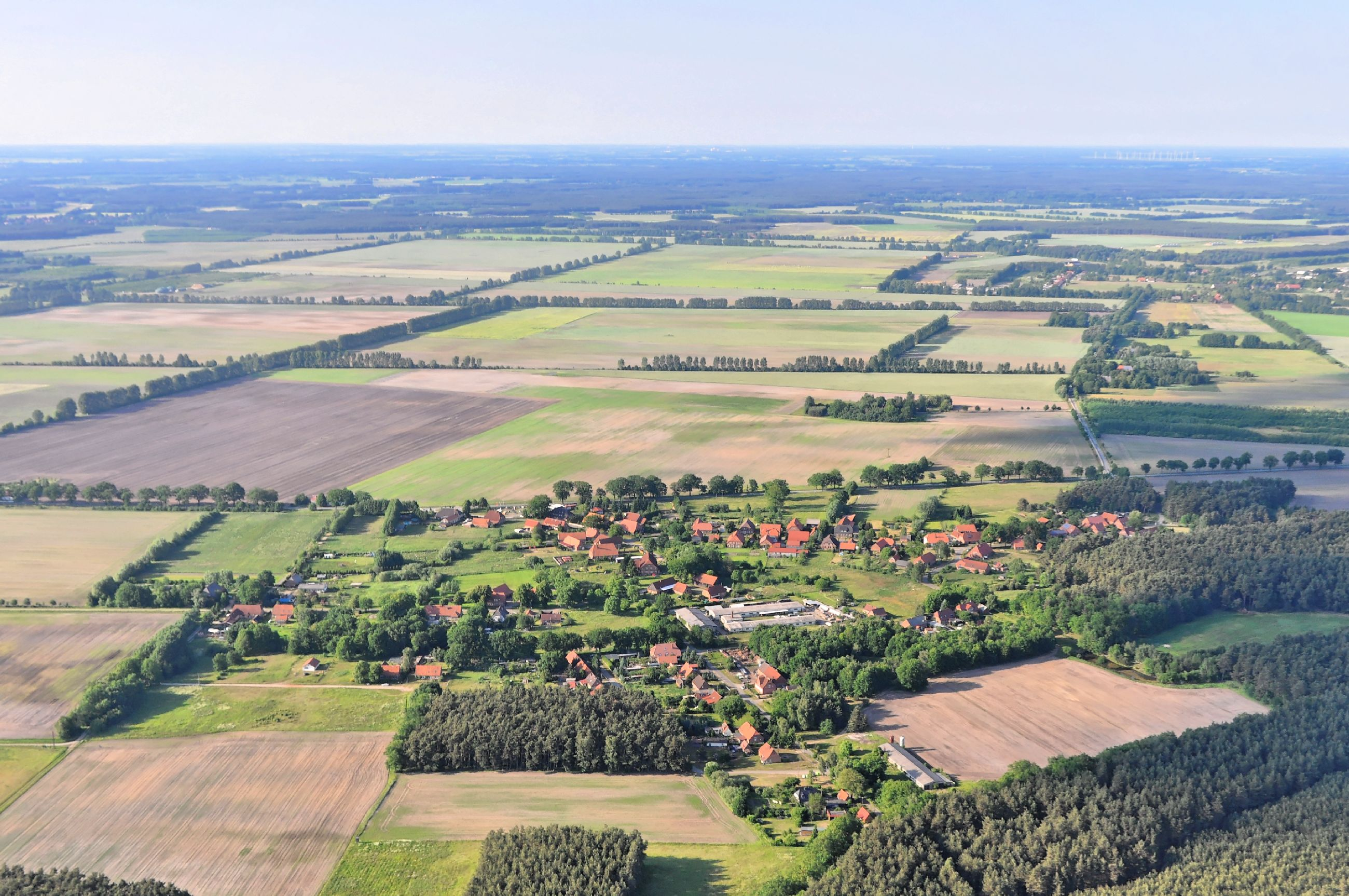
- Aerial photo of Groß Krams

- Location of Groß Krams within Ludwigslust-Parchim district
- Interactive map of Groß Krams
- Location within Germany Location within Mecklenburg-Vorpommern
- Coordinates: 53°19′N 11°16′E
- Country: Germany
- State: Mecklenburg-Vorpommern
- District: Ludwigslust-Parchim
- Municipal assoc.: Hagenow-Land

Government
  - Mayor: Tobias Alwardt

Area
  - Total: 10.32 km^{2} (3.98 sq mi)
- Elevation: 39 m (128 ft)

Population (2025-12-31)
  - Total: 159
  - Density: 15.4/km^{2} (39.9/sq mi)
- Time zone: UTC+01:00 (CET)
  - Summer (DST): UTC+02:00 (CEST)
- Postal codes: 19230
- Dialling codes: 038854
- Vehicle registration: LWL
- Website: www.amt-hagenow-land.de

Groß Krams is a municipality in the Ludwigslust-Parchim district, in Mecklenburg-Vorpommern, Germany. It is part of the collective municipality of Hagenow-Land.

== Geography ==
Groß Krams lies in the Griese Gegend, a forested region of southwestern Mecklenburg. It has an area of roughly 10.32 square kilometers, and has the Bundesstraße 5 passing through it.

The municipality borders Alt Krenzlin to the south, Bresegard bei Picher to the northeast, Belsch to the west, and Redefin to the northwest. It is part of the collective municipality of Hagenow-Land, by which it is surrounded on all sides but the south, as Alt Krenzlin is part of the collective municipality of Ludwigslust-Land.

== History ==
Groß Krams was integrated into the municipality of Redefin on 1 January 1974. It was again separated into its own municipality on 5 May 1990.

== Politics ==
=== Municipal council ===
The municipal council of Groß Krams has a total of 7 members, six of whom are elected directly from the municipal council's ballot while the seventh is the mayor, who is elected on a separate ballot on the same day. Before 2019, the municipal council only had 5 seats. The most recent municipal council election took place on 7 June 2024, as part of the 2024 Mecklenburg-Vorpommern local elections. It yielded the following results:

Party	Votes	%	Seats	
Party	Votes	%	Won	+/–
Ind. Birgit Schön	59	17.77	1	0
Ind. Verena Kircher	44	13.25	1	0
Ind. Ragnar Böhm	42	12.65	1	0
Ind. Sebastian Richter	37	11.14	1	0
Ind. Claudia Stein	36	10.84	1	0
Ind. Christiane Bogner	33	9.94	1	0
Ind. Sebastian Schwager	27	8.13	0	New
Ind. Anita Jungblut	19	5.72	0	New
Ind. Claudia Wetzel	18	5.42	0	New
Ind. Nikolaus Nürnberg	17	5.12	0	New
Total	332	100.0	6	0
Valid votes	332	97.08		
Invalid/blank votes	9	2.63		
Total votes	341	100.0		
Turnout	114	85.07		
Eligible voters	134			

Both voters' associations in the municipality did not run during the 2024 elections, resulting in every candidate running as an independent. All incumbents were reelected.

Previous elections had the following results:

Year Party	2024		2019	
Year Party	%	Seats	%	Seats
Aktiv GK	Did not run		56.79	3
AG proNatur	Did not run		22.53	1
Independents	100.0	6	20.68	2
Total	100.0	6	100.0	6

=== Mayor ===
Tobias Alwardt (independent, formerly Aktiv GK) was reelected as mayor of Groß Krams with during the 68.42% (78 votes) 2024 Mecklenburg-Vorpommern local elections; this marks an increase in total votes from his result in the 2019 election, during which he won 69.31% (70 votes).

Party	Votes	%
Ind. Tobias Alwardt	78	68.42
Ind. Wolfgang Gresens	24	21.05
Ind. Nikolaus Nürnberg	12	10.53
Total	114	100.0
Valid votes	114	100.0
Invalid/blank votes	0	0.00
Total votes	114	100.0
Turnout	114	85.07
Eligible voters	134	

=== Neo-Nazism ===
The NDR published a documentary called Mein Nachbar ist Nazi – Was tun? (English: My neighbor is a Nazi - what should I do?) in March 2021 which was primarily filmed in the municipality and concerned itself with the independent municipal council member Sebastian Richter, a former NPD politician who claimed adherence to pre-Hitler Nazism. Ragnar Böhm, the other independent municipal council member, who has also been noted as a neo-Nazi, wasn't strongly featured in the documentary due to declining an interview however.

There have been several events and organizations, such as Wage Mut!, in Groß Krams that wish to resist and reverse the influence of the far-right in the municipality.

=== Seal ===
Groß Krams does not have an official coat of arms or flag, it does however have an official seal described, but never visualized, in the main statute of the municipal council since 1999. According to the statute, the seal shows a bull's head looking ahead with a torn off neck fur and crown, around it the inscription: "GEMEINDE GROß KRAMS • LANDKREIS LUDWIGSLUST-PARCHIM".

== Sights ==
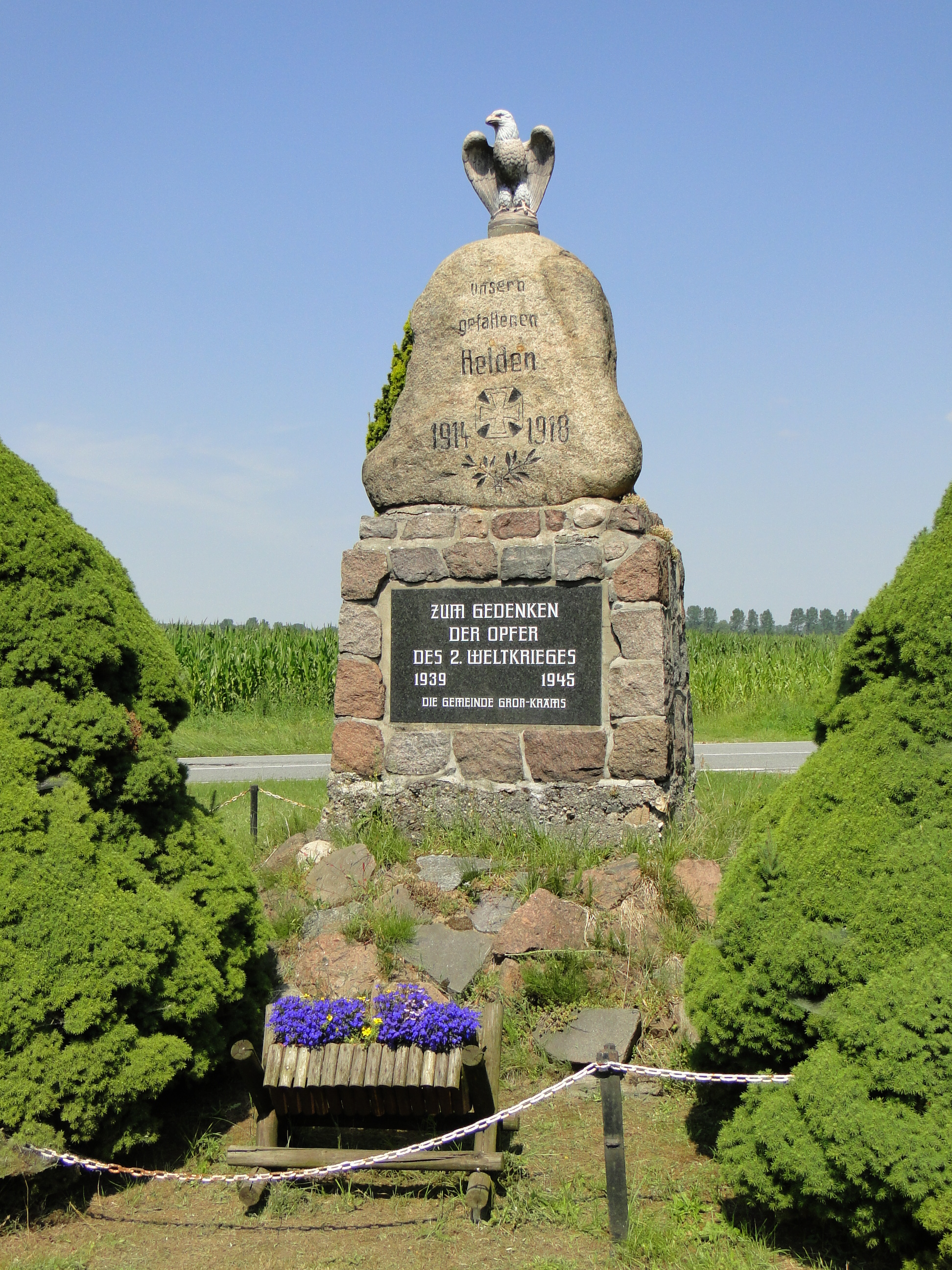
War memorial in Groß Krams

There is a war memorial for the fallen from World War I and World War II in Groß Krams. The village is also home to several historic and protected buildings.
