= Ludwigslust-Parchim =

Coordinates: 53°25′N 11°40′E

- District
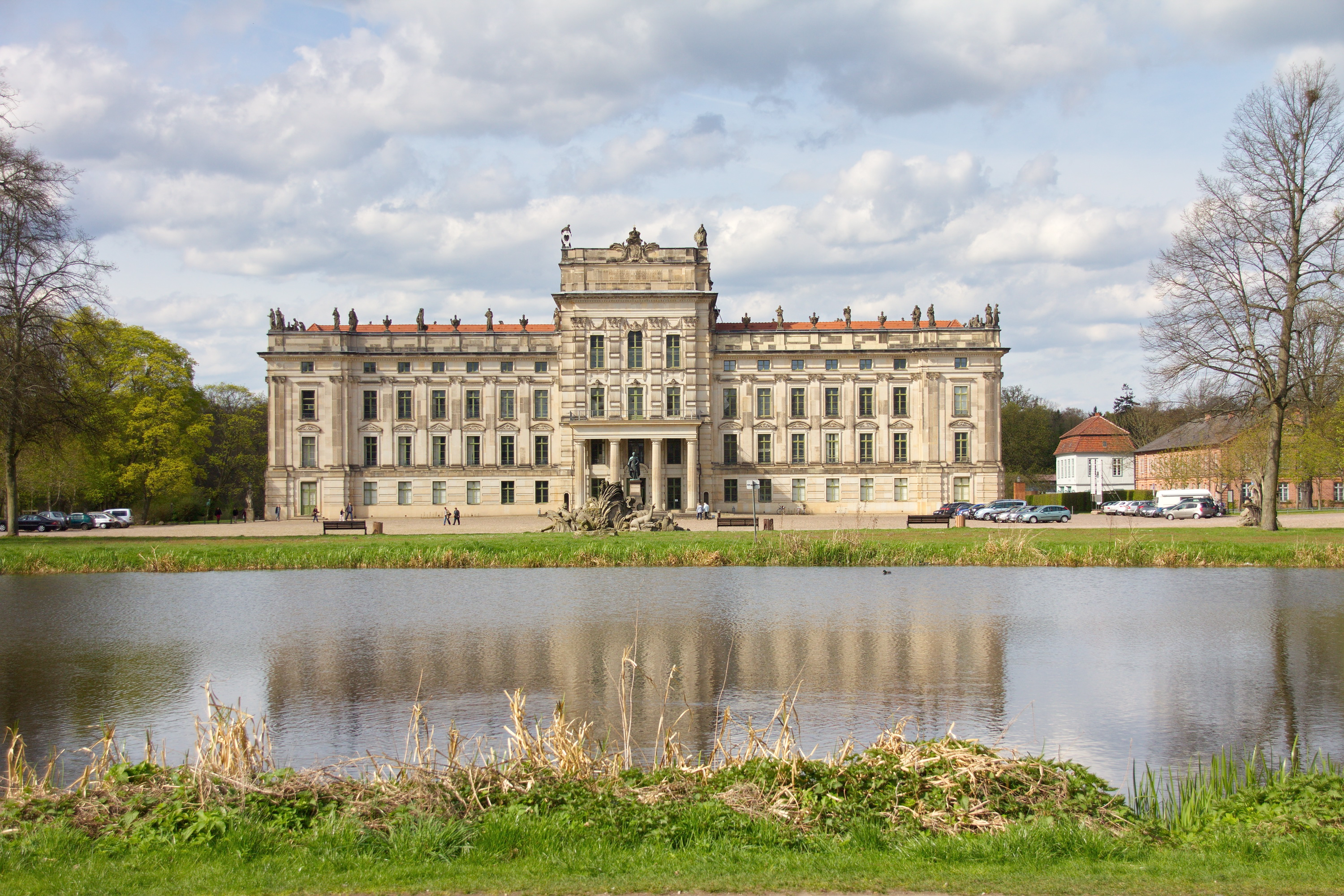
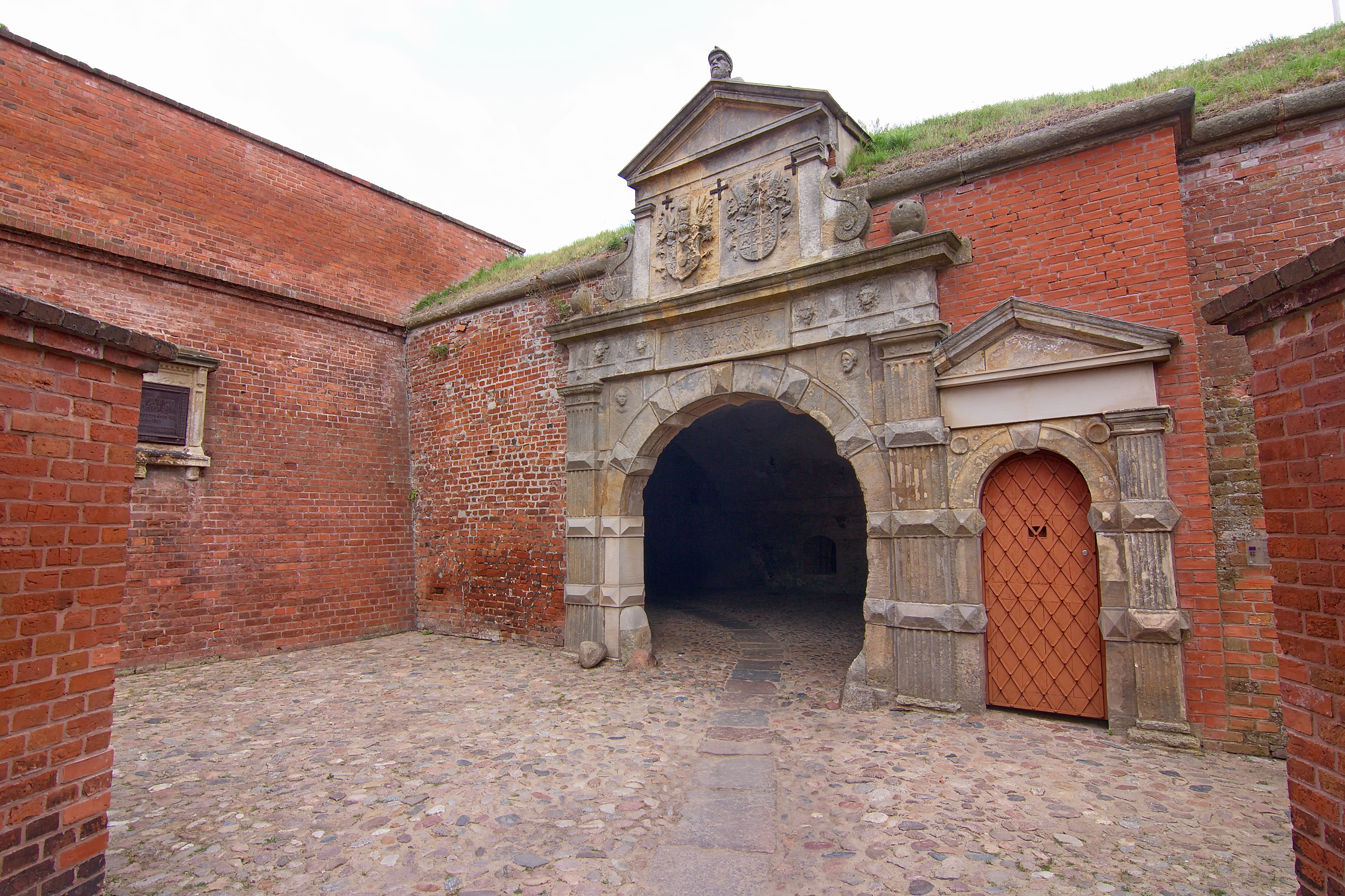
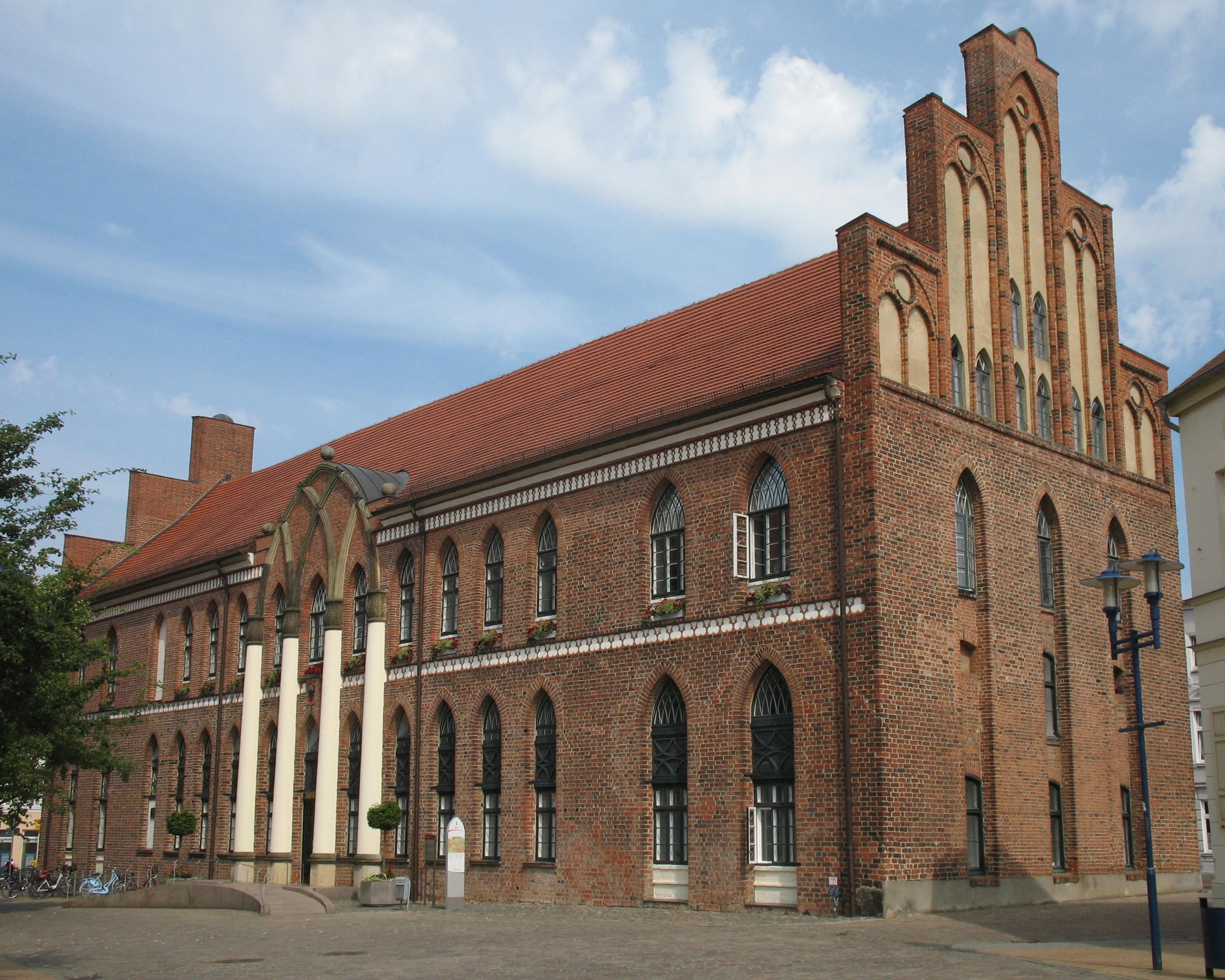
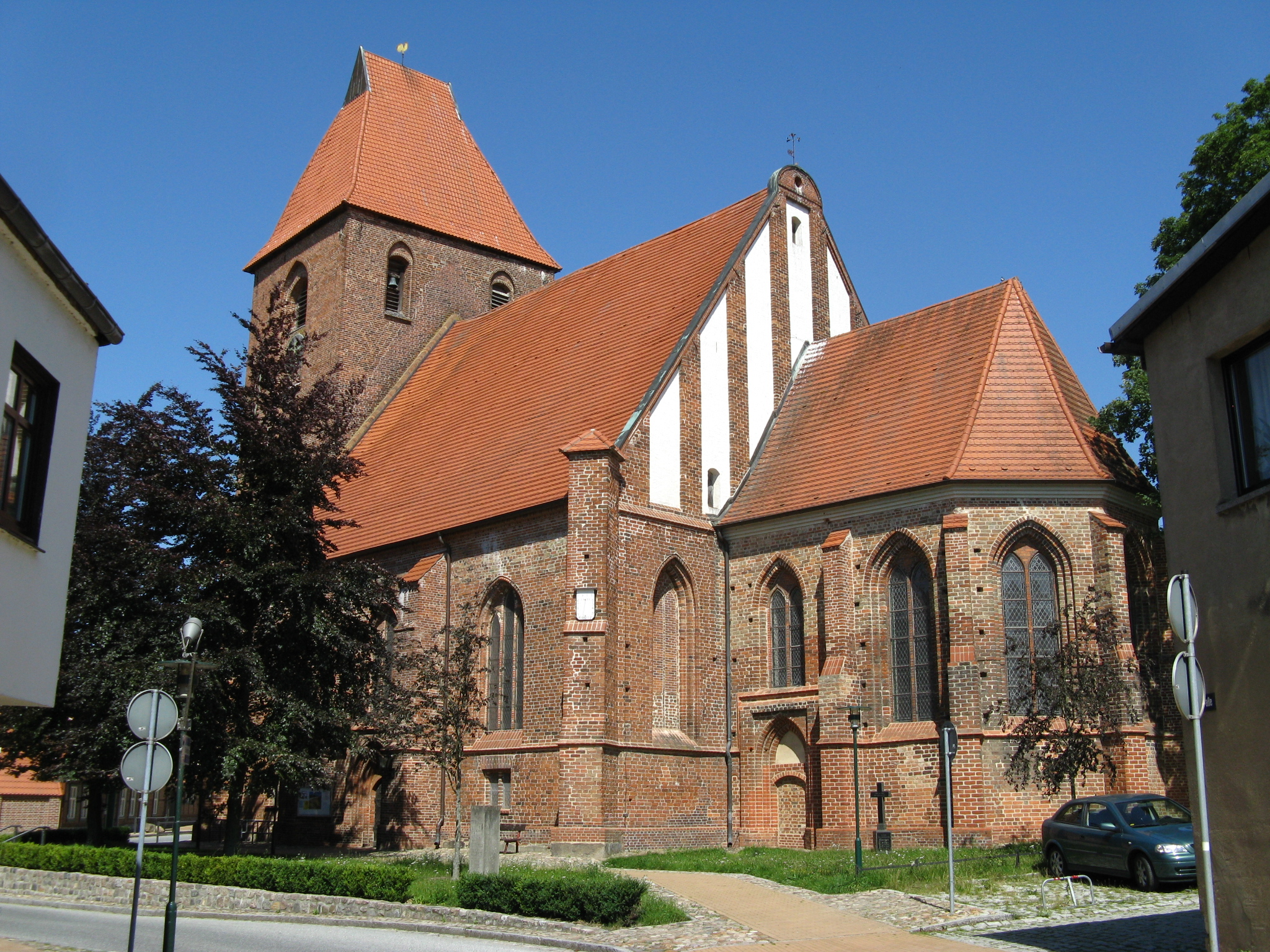
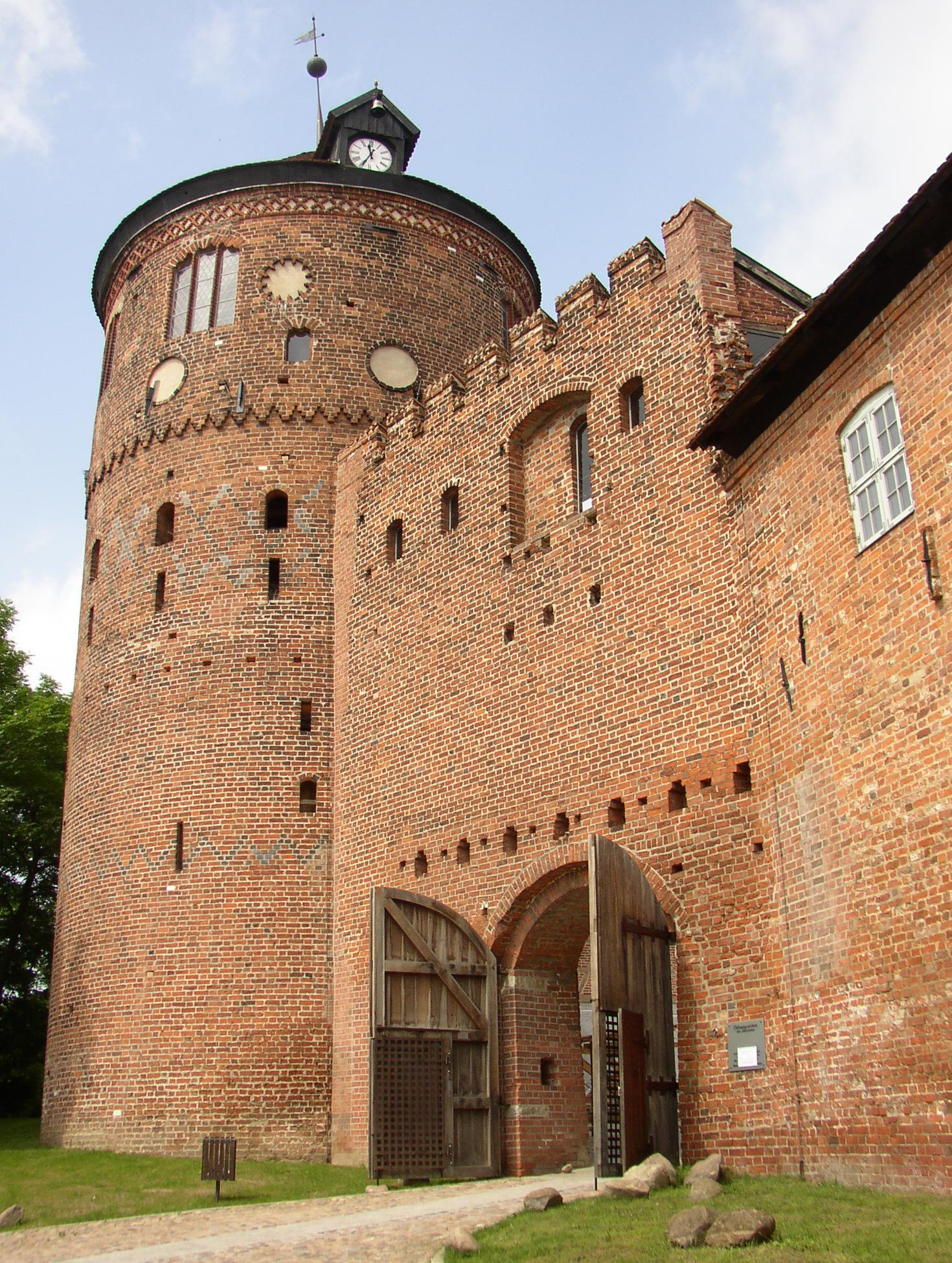
- Schloss Ludwigslust Dömitz Fortress Parchim town hall Crivitz town church Neustadt-Glewe castle

- Flag Coat of arms
- Country: Germany
- State: Mecklenburg-Vorpommern
- Capital: Parchim

Government
  - District admin.: Stefan Sternberg (SPD)

Area
  - Total: 4,750 km^{2} (1,830 sq mi)

Population (31 December 2025)
  - Total: 207,160
  - Density: 43.6/km^{2} (113/sq mi)
- Time zone: UTC+01:00 (CET)
  - Summer (DST): UTC+02:00 (CEST)
- Vehicle registration: LUP, HGN, LBZ, LWL, PCH, STB
- Website: www.kreis-lup.de

Ludwigslust-Parchim, commonly abbreviated as LUP, is a rural district in the southwest of Mecklenburg-Vorpommern, Germany. At 4,750 km^{2} (1,830 mi^{2}) it is the second largest district in all of Germany by area, only being surpassed by neighboring Mecklenburgische Seenplatte, while also having the lowest population density of the districts in Mecklenburg-Vorpommern and the sixth-lowest in Germany overall. Its territory comprises 145 municipalities, 16 thereof towns, most of which are administered by one of the 15 constituent Ämter in the district. The seat of the district administration is Parchim. It is a member of the Hamburg Metropolitan Region.

== Geography ==
The district lies in the southwest of the state of Mecklenburg-Vorpommern within the historical region of Mecklenburg. About half of the district is part of the Griese Gegend region, while the northwestern portions of the district, particularly near the town of Sternberg, are part of the Sternberger Seenlandschaft. The Elde river, originating from Altenhof in neighboring Mecklenburgische Seenplatte, flows through the whole southern length of the district, including through the towns Plau am See, Lübz, Parchim, Neustadt-Glewe, Grabow, and Dömitz. An outflow of the Lake Schwerin, the Stör, bisects the district and connects to the Elde by Neustadt-Glewe.

Within Mecklenburg-Vorpommern, the district only borders three other districts, Nordwestmecklenburg to the north, Rostock district to the northeast, and Mecklenburgische Seenplatte to the east; as well as the district-free city Schwerin to the north. The other borders of the district are shared with other states: Schleswig-Holstein (Duchy of Lauenburg district) to the west, Lower Saxony (Lüchow-Dannenberg district) to the southwest, and Brandenburg (Prignitz district) to the southeast.

=== Lakes ===
There are a number of lakes within the boundaries of Ludwigslust-Parchim district. The biggest lake in the district is the Plauer See, at 38.4 km^{2} (14.8 mi^{2}), on the western shore of which the town Plau am See lies, while the eastern shore constitutes the border between Ludwigslust-Parchim and the neighboring Mecklenburgische Seenplatte. Other notable lakes in the district include the Großer Sternberger See, Goldberger See, and the Barniner See as well as the Schaalsee shared with Schleswig-Holstein. The district is also the home of multiple quarry lakes.

== History ==
Ludwigslust-Parchim District was established by merging the former districts of Ludwigslust and Parchim as part of the local government reform of September 2011. The name of the district was decided by referendum on September 4, 2011. The project name for the district was Südwestmecklenburg.

== Towns and municipalities ==
The district is made-up of 15 Ämter, as well as five Amt-free towns. In total, it comprises 145 municipalities, of which 16 are towns.

Map of municipalities in Ludwigslust-Parchim with colors corresponding to the Amt they are a member of.
Amt-free towns	Ämter
1. Boizenburg; 2. Hagenow; 3. Lübtheen; 4. Ludwigslust; 5. Parchim	1. Boizenburg-Land [seat: Boizenburg]; 1. Bengerstorf; 2. Besitz; 3. Brahlstorf; 4. Dersenow; 5. Gresse; 6. Greven; 7. Neu Gülze; 8. Nostorf; 9. Schwanheide; 10. Teldau; 11. Tessin bei Boizenburg; 2. Crivitz; 1. Banzkow; 2. Barnin; 3. Bülow; 4. Cambs; 5. Crivitz^{1, 2}; 6. Demen; 7. Dobin am See; 8. Friedrichsruhe; 9. Gneven; 10. Langen Brütz; 11. Leezen; 12. Pinnow; 13. Plate; 14. Raben Steinfeld; 15. Sukow; 16. Tramm; 17. Zapel; 3. Dömitz-Malliß; 1. Dömitz^{1, 2}; 2. Grebs-Niendorf; 3. Karenz; 4. Malk Göhren; 5. Malliß; 6. Neu Kaliß; 7. Vielank; 4. Eldenburg Lübz; 1. Gallin-Kuppentin; 2. Gehlsbach; 3. Granzin; 4. Kreien; 5. Kritzow; 6. Lübz^{1, 2}; 7. Passow; 8. Ruhner Berge; 9. Siggelkow; 10. Werder	5. Goldberg-Mildenitz; 1. Dobbertin; 2. Goldberg^{1, 2}; 3. Mestlin; 4. Neu Poserin; 5. Techentin; 6. Grabow; 1. Balow; 2. Brunow; 3. Dambeck; 4. Eldena; 5. Gorlosen; 6. Grabow^{1, 2}; 7. Karstädt; 8. Kremmin; 9. Milow; 10. Möllenbeck; 11. Muchow; 12. Prislich; 13. Zierzow; 7. Hagenow-Land [seat: Hagenow]; 1. Alt Zachun; 2. Bandenitz; 3. Belsch; 4. Bobzin; 5. Bresegard bei Picher; 6. Gammelin; 7. Groß Krams; 8. Hoort; 9. Hülseburg; 10. Kirch Jesar; 11. Kuhstorf; 12. Moraas; 13. Pätow-Steegen; 14. Picher; 15. Pritzier; 16. Redefin; 17. Strohkirchen; 18. Toddin; 19. Warlitz	8. Ludwigslust-Land [seat: Ludwigslust]; 1. Alt Krenzlin; 2. Bresegard bei Eldena; 3. Göhlen; 4. Groß Laasch; 5. Lübesse; 6. Lüblow; 7. Rastow; 8. Sülstorf; 9. Uelitz; 10. Warlow; 11. Wöbbelin; 9. Neustadt-Glewe; 1. Blievenstorf; 2. Brenz; 3. Neustadt-Glewe^{1, 2}; 10. Parchimer Umland [seat: Parchim]; 1. Domsühl; 2. Groß Godems; 3. Karrenzin; 4. Lewitzrand; 5. Obere Warnow; 6. Rom; 7. Spornitz; 8. Stolpe; 9. Ziegendorf; 10. Zölkow; 11. Plau am See; 1. Barkhagen; 2. Ganzlin; 3. Plau am See^{1, 2}	12. Sternberger Seenlandschaft; 1. Blankenberg; 2. Borkow; 3. Brüel^{2}; 4. Dabel; 5. Hohen Pritz; 6. Kloster Tempzin; 7. Kobrow; 8. Kuhlen-Wendorf; 9. Mustin; 10. Sternberg^{1, 2}; 11. Weitendorf; 12. Witzin; 13. Stralendorf; 1. Dümmer; 2. Holthusen; 3. Klein Rogahn; 4. Pampow; 5. Schossin; 6. Stralendorf^{1}; 7. Warsow; 8. Wittenförden; 9. Zülow; 14. Wittenburg; 1. Wittenburg^{1, 2}; 2. Wittendörp; 15. Zarrentin; 1. Gallin; 2. Kogel; 3. Lüttow-Valluhn; 4. Vellahn; 5. Zarrentin am Schaalsee^{1, 2}
	^{1} - seat of the Amt; ^{2} - town

== Politics ==
=== District council ===
Total 76 seats
- Left: 6
- BSW: 6
- SPD: 12
- Greens: 3
- WLD: 1
- VAH: 1
- ABLR: 2
- AfL: 1
- FH LUP: 1
- FDP: 2
- FW: 1
- CDU: 20
- AfD: 18
- Ind.: 1
- HuI: 1
Total 76 seats
- BSW-FH: 7
- ZLP: 20
- FDP/ABLR/AfL: 5
- Non-attached: 6
- CDU: 20
- AfD: 18

Although the regular size of the district council is 77 members, the current council consists of only 76 due to the Sahra Wagenknecht Alliance (BSW) winning seven seats but only having six candidates, one seat thus remains vacant. The last district council election was held during the 2024 Mecklenburg-Vorpommern local elections and yielded the following results:

Party	Votes	%	Seats		
Party	Votes	%	Awarded	Filled	+/–
Christian Democratic Union of Germany (CDU)	87,813	26.1	20	20	0
Alternative for Germany (AfD)	80,464	23.9	19	19	▲9
Social Democratic Party of Germany (SPD)	52,440	15.6	12	12	▼5
Sahra Wagenknecht Alliance (BSW)	30,684	9.1	7	6	New
The Left (LINKE)	25,950	7.7	6	6	▼6
Alliance 90/The Greens (GRÜNE)	10,580	3.1	3	3	▼2
Free Democratic Party (FDP)	9,222	2.7	2	2	▼2
Alliance Farmers Rural Regions (ABLR)	8,935	2.7	2	2	0
Free Voters	5,895	1.8	1	1	▼1
Alternative for Ludwigslust (AfL)	5,179	1.5	1	1	0
Free Horizon LUP	4,238	1.3	1	1	▼1
Home and Identity (HuI)	4,225	1.3	1	1	New (Note: Although HuI is a legally independent group, its personnel is nearly identical with that of The Homeland which partook in the last election under its old name National Democratic Party of Germany (NPD) where it won one seat (meaning a seat change of 0). However, when the HuI faction in the district council was founded with four former AfD-members, the contiguous organization had 5 seats (meaning a seat change of -4).)
Forward Former District Hagenow (VAH)	2,563	0.8	1	1	New
We Live Democracy (WLD)	2,452	0.7	1	1	0
Active Voters' Community Dobbertin (AWD)	1,746	0.5	0	0	0
Alliance Germany (BD)	933	0.3	0	0	New
Voters' Group Municipality Plate (WGP)	674	0.2	0	0	New
Independents	2,581	0.8	0	0	0
Total	336,574	100.0	77	76	▼1
Valid votes	336,574	98.3			
Invalid/blank votes	5,901	1.7			
Total votes	342,475	100.0			
Turnout	116,604	65.9			
Eligible voters	177,941				

The following factions were founded after the election: CDU (20 seats), AfD (20 seats), The Future Ludwigslust-Parchim (German: Die Zukunft Ludwigslust-Parchim, ZLP, 19 seats) consisting of the Social Democratic Party of Germany (SPD), The Left, Forward Former District Hagenow (German: Vorwärts Altkreis Hagenow, VAH), and We Live Democracy (German: Wir leben Demokratie, WLD); BSW-FH (7 seats), and the FDP/ABLR/AfL (5 seats).The remaining members stayed without a faction.

One member of The Left, Angelika Gramkow, decided against joining the ZLP faction due to "personal reasons" and was thus without a faction until stepping down from her office in March 2025 when she was replaced by Andreas Sturm who did join the faction, thus increasing its number of seats to 20. Lorenz Dietrich, former member of the AfD-faction, stepped down from his office in July 2025 and was replaced by Normund Behning. Another former AfD-faction member, Martin Zenker, was excluded from the faction in August 2025, thus decreasing the seats of the AfD faction to 18. Zenker remains a member of the council as a non-attached member.

The AfD district politician and Neonazi Philip Steinbeck beat and envious young people in 2025 and posted a video of it online. In Community House Lübtheen, he harassed two teenagers and forced them to lick a German flag. He was investigated for aggravated assault, coercion, and insult. The state AfD subsequently initiated party expulsion proceedings.

Previous elections had the following results:

Year Party	2024		2019		2014		2011	
Year Party	%	Seats	%	Seats	%	Seats	%	Seats
CDU	26.1	20	25.9	20	23.0	25	27.7	21
AfD	23.9	19	12.5	10	2.9	2	did not exist	
SPD	15.6	12	22.0	17	25.5	20	32.3	25
BSW	9.1	6 (Note: The BSW was awarded 7 seats but only had 6 candidates.)	did not exist		did not exist		did not exist	
The Left	7.7	6	16.2	12	17.8	14	17.8	14
Greens	3.1	3	6.2	5	4.1	3	5.6	4
FDP	2.7	2	4.7	4	3.9	3	4.8	4
ABLR	2.7	2	1.1	1	5.9	4	3.2	3
FW	1.8	1	2.1	2	0.9	1	1.1	1
AfL (Note: In 2011: BfL (Bürger für Ludwigslust))	1.5	1	1.1	1	1.3	1	0.6	0
FH LUP	1.3	1	2.5	2	did not exist		did not exist	
HuI/NPD (Note: Although legally distinct, the personnel of HuI is nearly identical with that of The Homeland. Before 2024, results of The Homeland, which was still called National Democratic Party of Germany (NPD) at the time, are shown.)	1.3	1	1.7	1	3.5	3	5.5	4
VAH	0.8	1	did not exist		did not exist		did not exist	
WLD	0.7	1	0.8	1	did not exist		did not exist	
AWD	0.5	0	0.6	0	0.4	0	did not exist	
BD	0.3	0	did not exist		did not exist		did not exist	
WGP	0.2	0	did not exist		did not exist		did not exist	
AWGV	did not run		0.3	0	did not exist		did not exist	
Piraten	did not run		did not run		0.8	1	did not run	
WG "Wöbbelin"	did not run		did not run		0.2	0	did not exist	
PARTEI	did not run		did not run		did not run		0.1	0
AUF	did not exist		did not exist		did not run		0.5	0
Independents	0.8	0	0.7	0	0.7	0	0.7	0
Total	100	76	100	77	100	77	100	77

=== Landrat ===
The current district administrator (Landrat) is Stefan Sternberg of the Social Democratic Party of Germany (SPD).

== Culture ==
Due to its large area the culture of Ludwigslust-Parchim is diverse.

According to the district administration, there are over 300 active artists of various forms in the district. A district-awarded prize, the Ludwig-Reinhard-Kulturpreis, is directed at rewarding 'artistic engagement' in Ludwigslust-Parchim. The Art and Culture Council of Ludwigslust-Parchim (German: KunstKulturRat Ludwigslust-Parchim) aims to support and represent local artists.

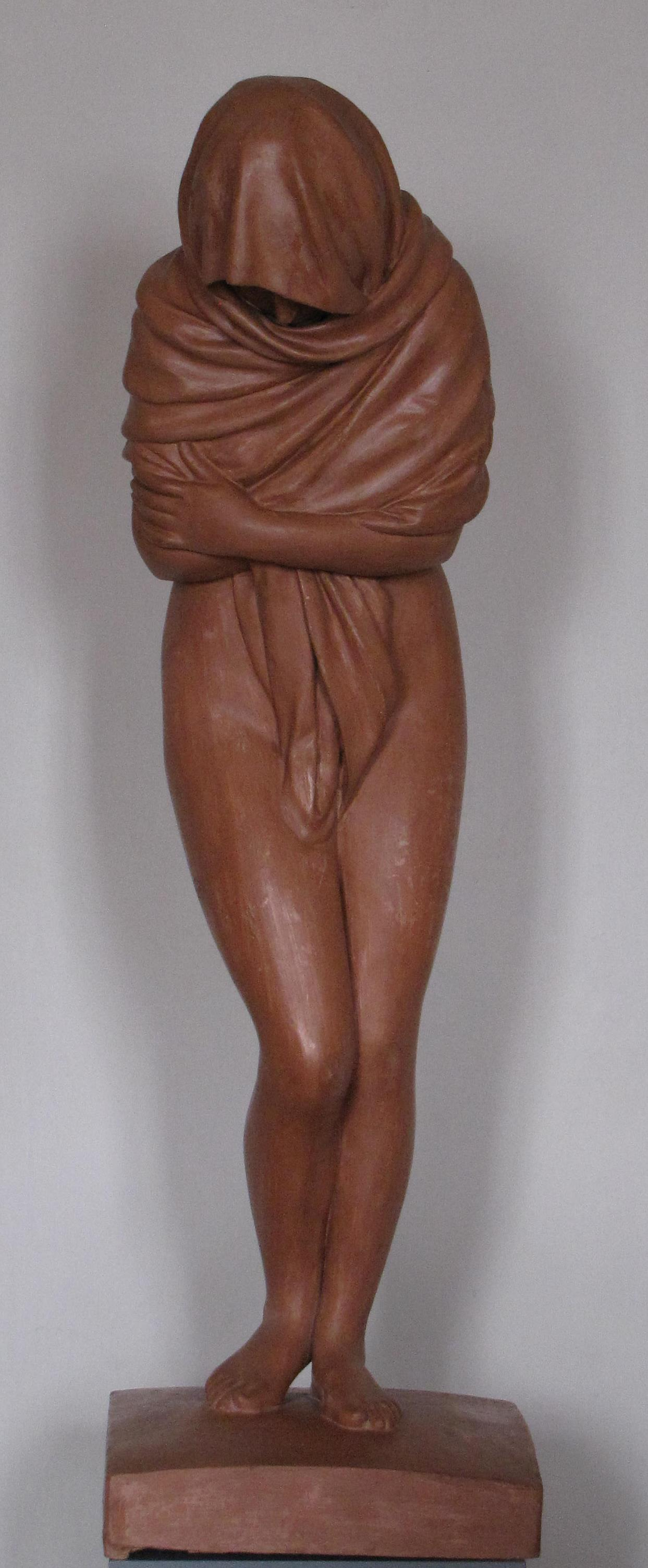
A Ludwigslust Carton recreation of La Frileuse in the Ludwigslust Palace

Around the middle of the 18th century, Johann Georg Bachmann invented a special technique to manufacture papier-mâché so as to make the material more robust and, most importantly, weatherproof. This new technique became known as the "Ludwigsluster Carton" as it originated from the city of Ludwigslust, where Bachmann introduced the method to Grand Duke Frederick II who was currently building a palace in the city. Today, many sculptures of the material can still be found across Europe, but particularly in the city of Ludwigslust and its palace.

Like most regions of Germany, Ludwigslust-Parchim is rich with local legends. Among the most notable of which is that of Räuber Vieting about a major robber in the areas around Parchim. According to legend, the hideout of this robber was located at a cave in the Sonnenberg nearby, a location that now serves as a tourist attraction. Other legends are about the creation of natural features, like the one of Propst Jesar (in Lübtheen) which talks of how the lake was created by a curse Zigeuner put on the village as revenge, or about the names of their settlements like that of Strohkirchen that alleges the village name originates with a feared thief. Multiple legends exist around the Schaalsee, including one of a nun outsmarting the devil and one alleging that a tin can used to measure the depth of the lake came back up molten.

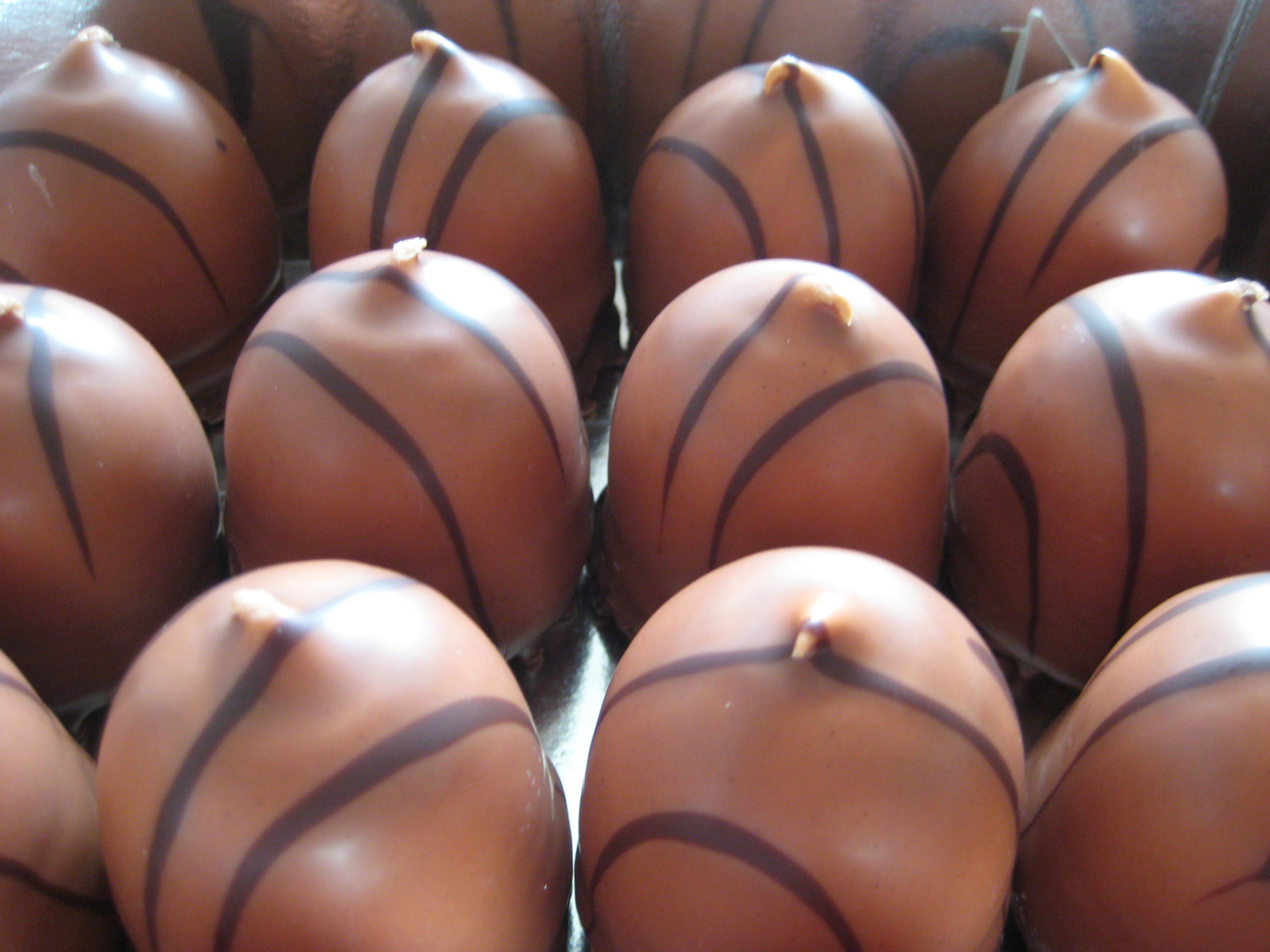
Grabower Küßchen

The "Grabower Küßchen" are a well known chocolate-coated marshmallow treat from the town of Grabow.

Multiple annual festivals are held across the districts' territory. These include festivals like the Martinimarkt fairs in towns like Parchim and Grabow. The annual castle festival in Neustadt-Glewe has attracted international interest and the light festival in Grabow has been described as a mix of a Volksfest and light show. There are several reoccurring music festivals located in the district, including Airbeat One in Neustadt-Glewe, which is among the biggest music festivals in Germany. Weekly markets are common in most towns.

Notable museums in the district include the Ludwigslust Palace, Parchim museum, Neustadt-Glewe castle, the old Synagogue in Hagenow, and the various Wöbbelin concentration camp memorials. The village of Rüterberg, a city district of Dömitz, has several sights relating to its former status as a village enclosed within the Berlin Wall that eventually declared independence as a village-republic.

Artists from the region include the authors Johannes Gillhoff and Leonhard Adelt, the painters Rudolph Suhrlandt, Wilhelm Langschmidt, Hermann Koch, and Heinrich Pommerencke; the lithographer Wilhelmine Suhrlandt, the photographer Louise Abel, the sculptors Wilhelm Wandschneider and Günther Uecker, the architect Erich zu Putlitz, the composers Johann Leopold Abel and Christiane Klonz, as well as the conductors Gustav Hinrichs and Heiko Mathias Förster.
