= Strohkirchen =

- Municipality
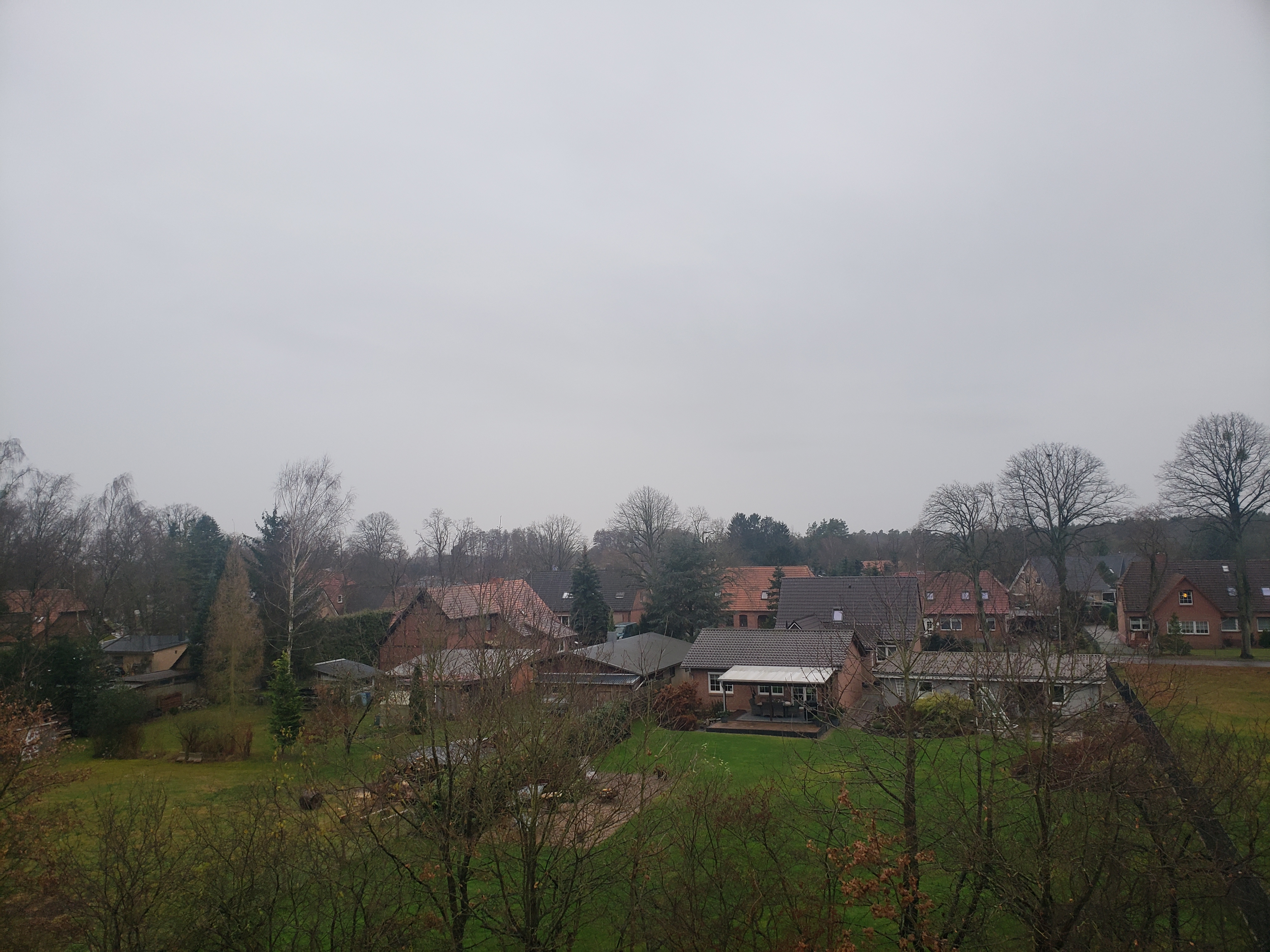

- Flag Coat of arms

- Location of Strohkirchen within Ludwigslust-Parchim district
- Interactive map of Strohkirchen
- Location within Germany Location within Mecklenburg-Vorpommern
- Coordinates: 53°23′N 11°18′E
- Country: Germany
- State: Mecklenburg-Vorpommern
- District: Ludwigslust-Parchim
- Municipal assoc.: Hagenow-Land

Government
  - Mayor: Monique Flöter

Area
  - Total: 14.78 km^{2} (5.71 sq mi)
- Elevation: 25 m (82 ft)

Population (2025-12-31)
  - Total: 317
  - Density: 21.4/km^{2} (55.5/sq mi)
- Time zone: UTC+01:00 (CET)
  - Summer (DST): UTC+02:00 (CEST)
- Postal codes: 19230
- Dialling codes: 038751
- Vehicle registration: LWL
- Website: www.amt-hagenow-land.de

Strohkirchen is a municipality in the Ludwigslust-Parchim district of the German state Mecklenburg-Vorpommern. Administratively it is part of the collective municipality of Amt Hagenow-Land.

== Geography ==
Strohkirchen lies roughly 20 kilometers south of the state capital Schwerin and around seven kilometers east of Hagenow, the seat of its collective municipality (Hagenow-Land). It lies in a geographical region of Mecklenburg known as the Griese Gegend. The municipality consists of a single settlement built along the Strohkirchner Bach.

The municipality is bordered by Moraas to the north, Rastow to the northeast, Picher to the east and south, Bresegard bei Picher to the southwest, and Kuhstorf to the west.

Strohkirchen lies on the Berlin–Hamburg Railway, although its small station is only serviced by the RB14 line of ODEG.

== History ==
Strohkirchen has since its establishment been a linear settlement in the German style (Straßendorf) and has always been characterized by agriculture, only settling small service and crafts companies in the village after German reunification.

According to a local legend the village gained its name from a thieving miller, named Strohkark, who resided in the village. This miller, who lived in a large castle-like mill on the Jasnitz, would worry and scare the surrounding villages with his thieving antics, storing these stolen riches in his castle. One day, the villagers decided to stop him but before they could catch him, Strohkark buried his treasures and fled to the other side of the Elbe, never to be seen again. It is unknown if this is the actual origin of the village's name, but it is considered to be possible.

== Demographics ==
As of the 2022 census, Strohkirchen had a population of 310, thereof 163 male and 148 female. Two people in the municipality have a non-German citizenship and five people in the municipality were born outside of Germany.

Historical population

Year	Pop.	±%
1933	441	—
1939	393	−10.9%
1946	709	+80.4%
1990	301	−57.5%
2001	345	+14.6%

Year	Pop.	±%
2006	327	−5.2%
2011	318	−2.8%
2022	310	−2.5%
2023	307	−1.0%

Data may be affected by territorial fluctuation.
Sources: 1946–2006, 1933 & 1939 1990/2001/2011/2022

=== Religion ===
The majority of the municipality's population, 83% (258 people) are irreligious or do not belong to a state-recognized confession. 13.8% (43 people) belong to the Evangelical Church in Germany and 3.2% (10 people) belong to the Roman Catholic Church in Germany.

== Politics ==
=== Municipal council ===
The municipal council of Strohkirchen consists of six members, including the mayor. Since the 2024 local elections in Mecklenburg-Vorpommern it has consisted entirely of the Wählergemeinschaft FSV Strohkirchen, which won 100% of the vote as the only participating group. The following members were elected:

- Andreas Dziedo
- Philipp Siems
- Dirk Kanter
- Patrick Timm
- Doreen Lubadel
- Bernd Windischmann

In the 2019 municipal elections, two groups participated, the Wählergemeinschaft FSV Strohkirchen and the Wählergemeinschaft Kulturverein Strohkirchen (WGKV). The former won 70.72% of the vote and four seats, while the latter won 29.28% of the vote and two seats.

=== Mayor ===
The mayor of Strohkirchen is Monique Flöter. In the 2019 municipal elections, Flöter was a member of the group Wählergemeinschaft Kulturverein Strohkirchen (WGKV) and ran unopposed, winning 77.36% of the vote. She ran again in the 2024 municipal election, this time as an independent, and won 84.98% of the vote, triumphing over her independent opponent Uwe Werner.

==== List of mayors ====
- since 2019: Monique Flöter (WGKV/Ind.)
- 2004-2019: Bärbel Romanowski

=== Coat of arms and flag ===
The coat of arms was designed by Karl-Heinz Steinbruch from Schwein. It was adopted by the municipal council on 10 February 1999 and approved by the minister for the interior of Mecklenburg-Vorpommern on 23 September 1999. The flag of the municipality was approved on 18 April 2007.

Blazon: "Shield parted abased by a barrulet wavy Or, above Gules a farmhouse Or with half timber and agble shelves Sable, beneath Vert a watermill's lower demi-wheel Or."

== Culture and associations ==
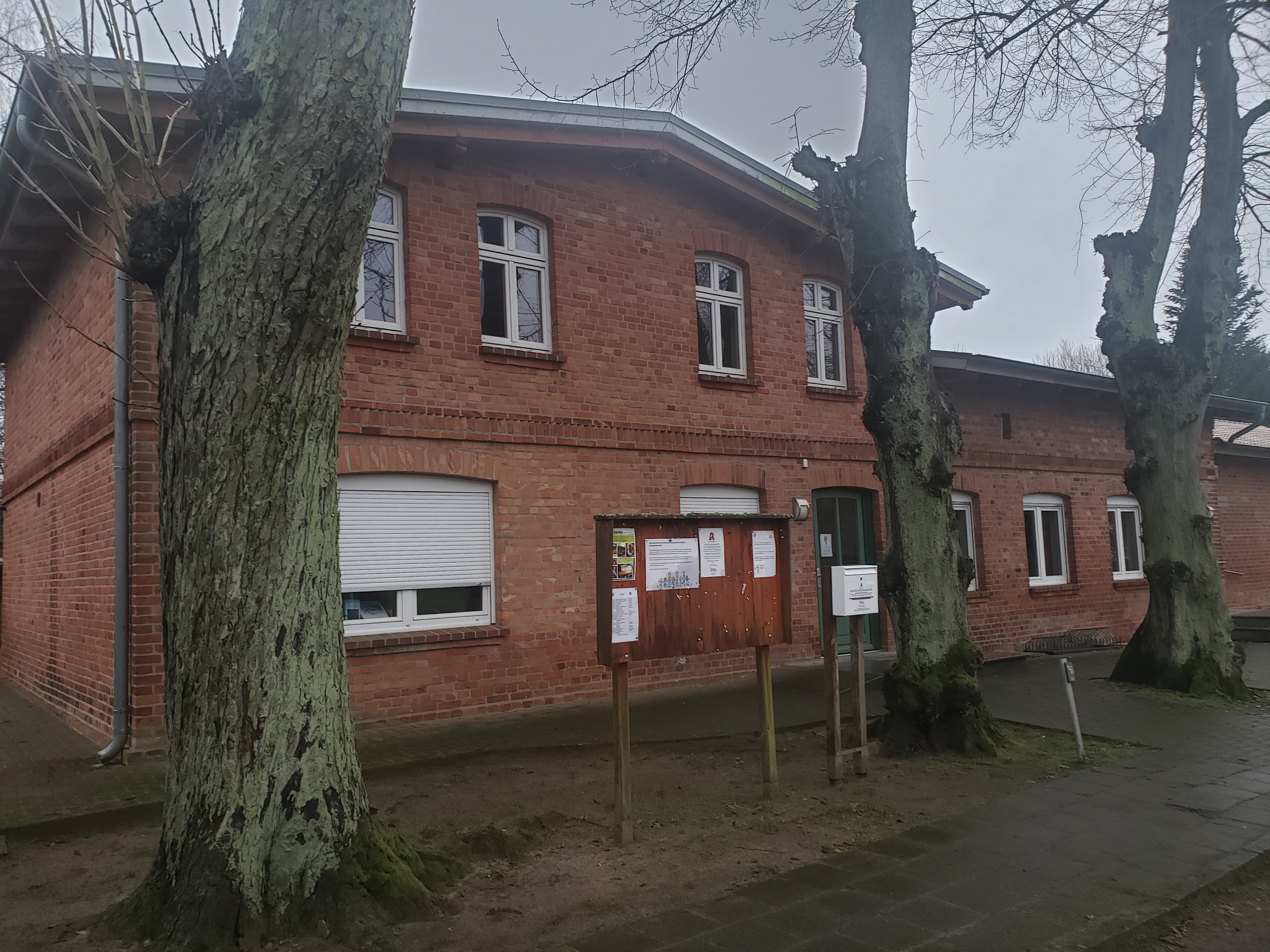
Community centre

The FSV Strohkirchen e.V. is the local football team and looks back on a tradition of over 60 years, being founded in 1964. A volunteer fire department, named Freiwillige Feuerwehr Strohkirchen, exists in the village. The community centre of Strohkirchen functions not only as the municipal council and administration but also as a public library.

Strohkirchen is home to a kindergarten, the Kindergarten Strohkirchen "Storchkinder".

The annual AJUNA Open Air festival takes place in the municipality since 2021.

== Gallery ==
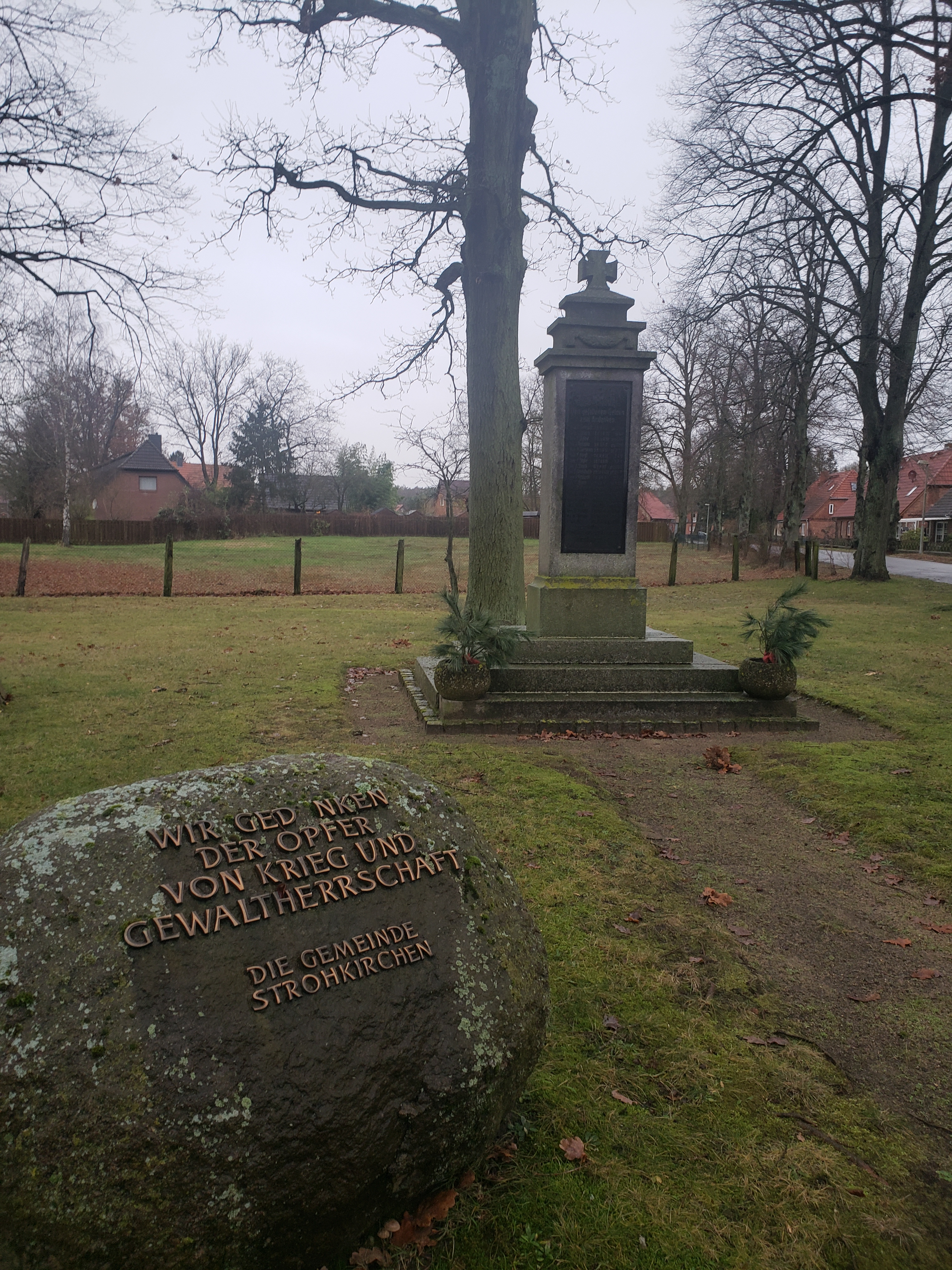
World War I memorial

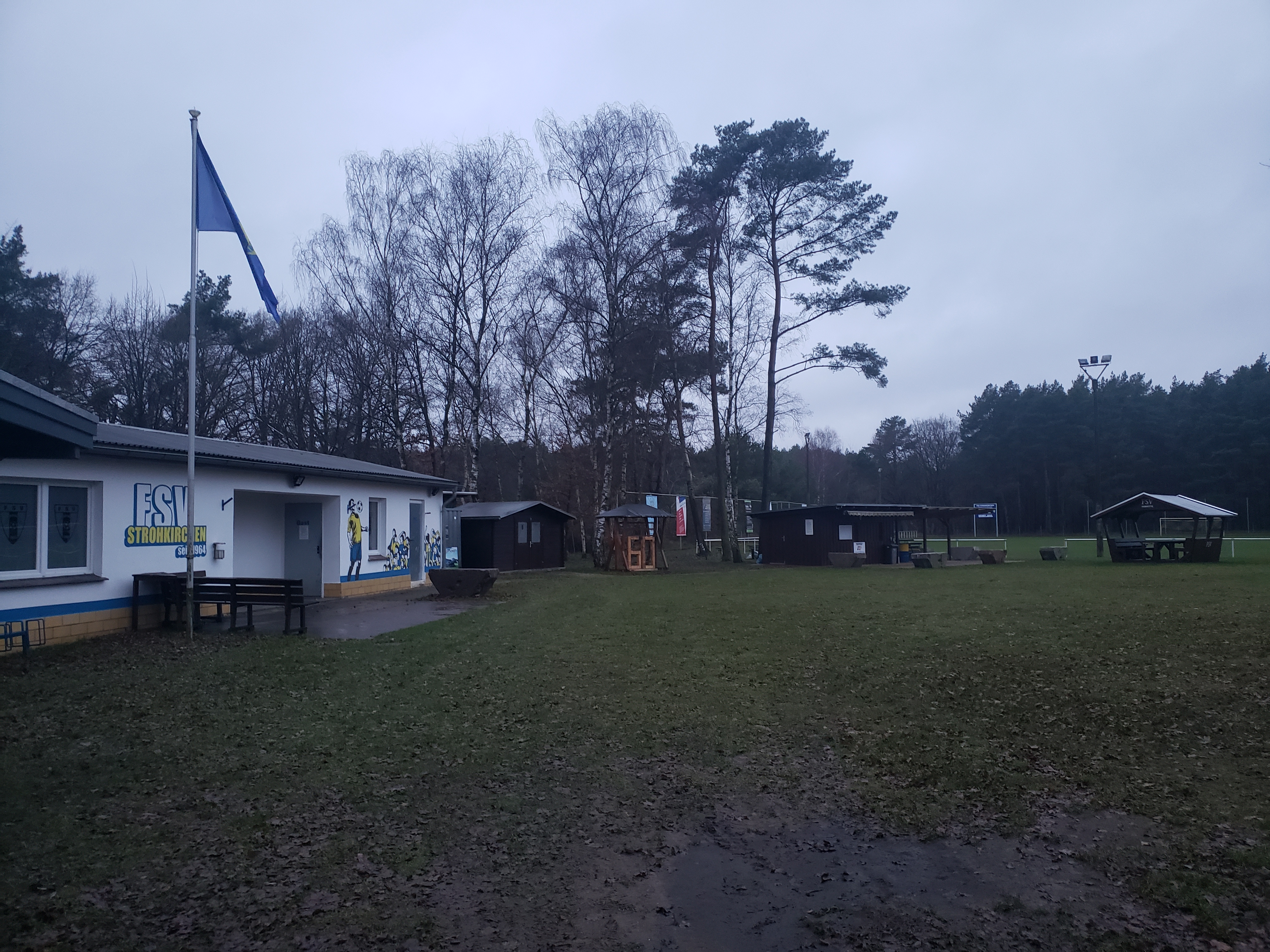
Strohkirchen FSV grounds

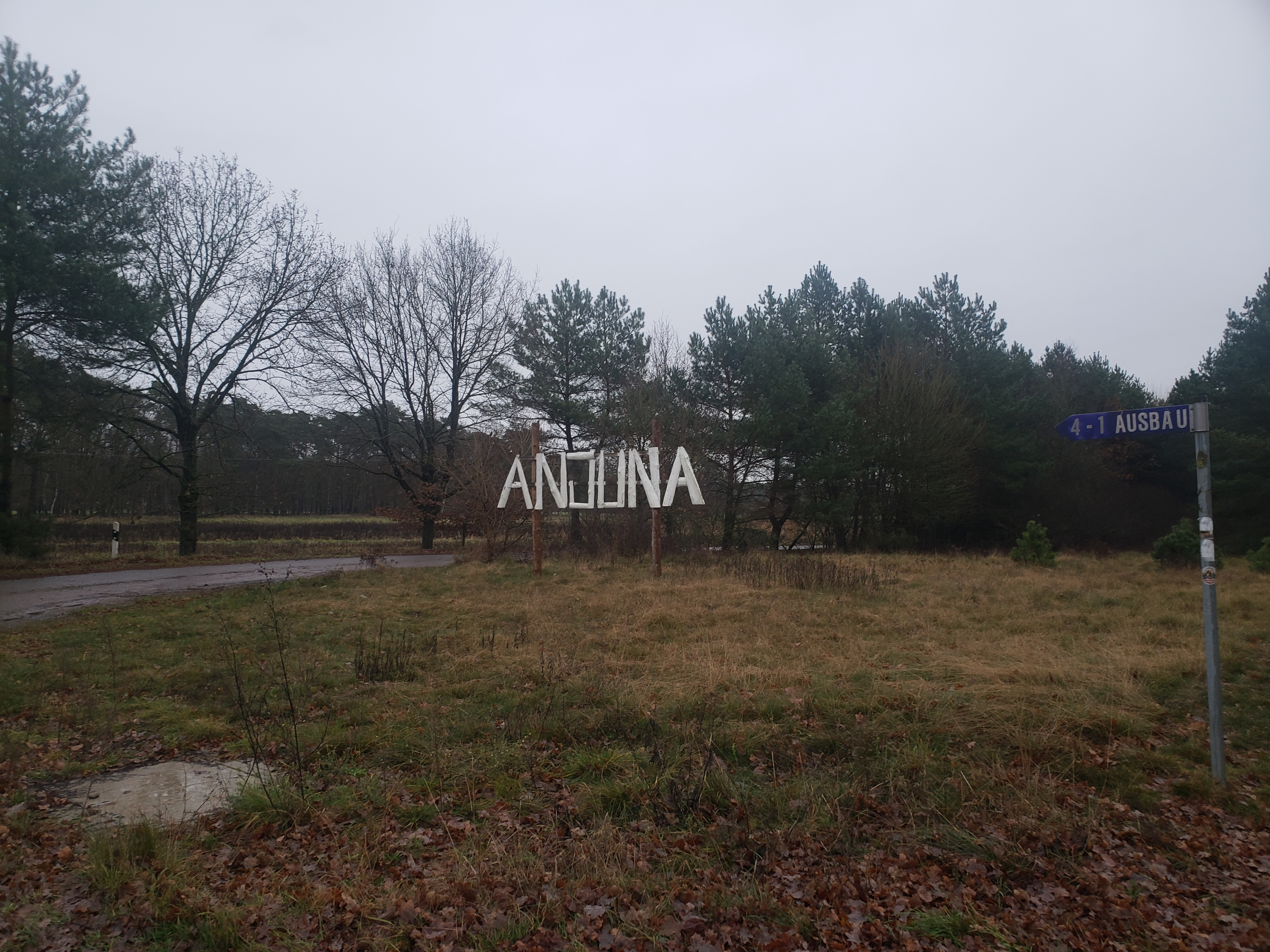
Entrance sign to the ANJUNA festival grounds
