= Bandenitz =

- Municipality
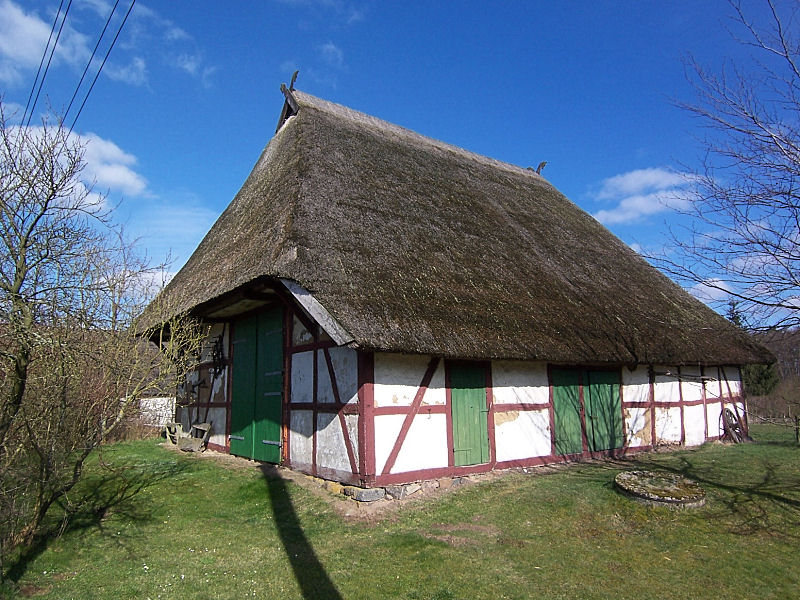
- Traditional house in Bandenitz

- Coat of arms

- Location of Bandenitz within Ludwigslust-Parchim district
- Interactive map of Bandenitz
- Location within Germany Location within Mecklenburg-Vorpommern
- Coordinates: 53°28′N 11°16′E
- Country: Germany
- State: Mecklenburg-Vorpommern
- District: Ludwigslust-Parchim
- Municipal assoc.: Hagenow-Land
- Subdivisions: 3

Government
  - Mayor: Jürgen Sänger

Area
  - Total: 17.36 km^{2} (6.70 sq mi)
- Elevation: 34 m (112 ft)

Population (2025-12-31)
  - Total: 525
  - Density: 30.2/km^{2} (78.3/sq mi)
- Time zone: UTC+01:00 (CET)
  - Summer (DST): UTC+02:00 (CEST)
- Postal codes: 19230
- Dialling codes: 038850, 038859
- Vehicle registration: LUP, HGN, LBZ, LWL, PCH, STB
- Website: www.amt-hagenow-land.de

Bandenitz is a municipality in the Ludwigslust-Parchim district, in Mecklenburg-Vorpommern, Germany.
