= Bobzin =

Municipality in Mecklenburg-Vorpommern, Germany

- Municipality
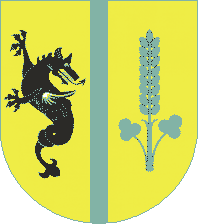
- Coat of arms

- Location of Bobzin within Ludwigslust-Parchim district
- Interactive map of Bobzin
- Location within Germany Location within Mecklenburg-Vorpommern
- Coordinates: 53°28′N 11°09′E
- Country: Germany
- State: Mecklenburg-Vorpommern
- District: Ludwigslust-Parchim
- Municipal assoc.: Hagenow-Land

Government
  - Mayor: Axel Pamperin

Area
  - Total: 6.04 km^{2} (2.33 sq mi)
- Elevation: 43 m (141 ft)

Population (2025-12-31)
  - Total: 259
  - Density: 42.9/km^{2} (111/sq mi)
- Time zone: UTC+01:00 (CET)
  - Summer (DST): UTC+02:00 (CEST)
- Postal codes: 19230
- Dialling codes: 038852
- Vehicle registration: LWL
- Website: www.amt-hagenow-land.de

Bobzin is a municipality in the Ludwigslust-Parchim district, in Mecklenburg-Vorpommern, Germany.
