= Warsow, Mecklenburg-Vorpommern =

Warsow
- Municipality
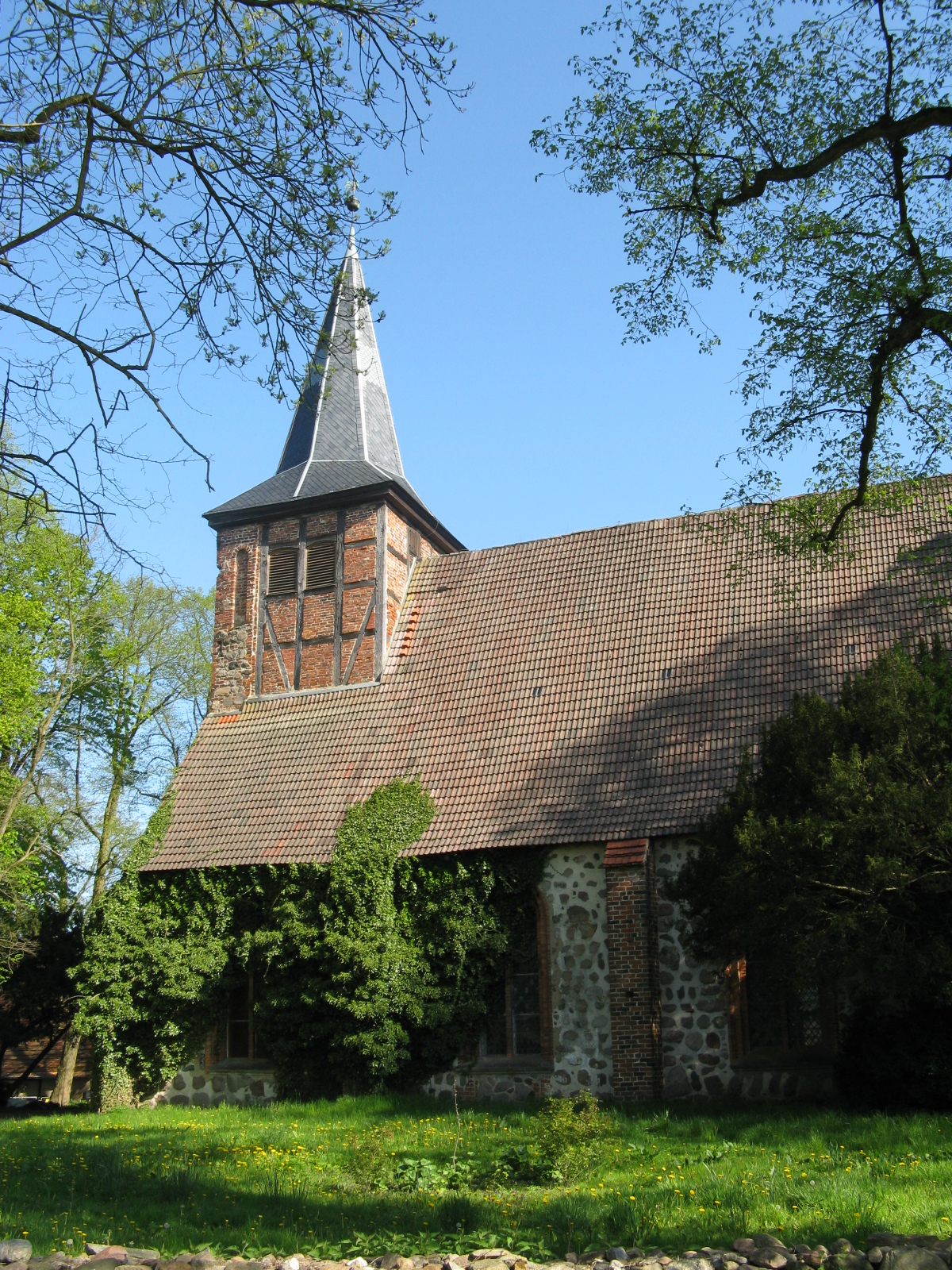
- Warsow village church

- Location of Warsow within Ludwigslust-Parchim district
- Interactive map of Warsow
- Location within Germany Location within Mecklenburg-Vorpommern
- Coordinates: 53°31′N 11°18′E
- Country: Germany
- State: Mecklenburg-Vorpommern
- District: Ludwigslust-Parchim
- Municipal assoc.: Stralendorf
- Subdivisions: 3

Government
  - Mayor: Gisela Buller

Area
  - Total: 14.89 km^{2} (5.75 sq mi)
- Elevation: 44 m (144 ft)

Population (2025-12-31)
  - Total: 653
  - Density: 43.9/km^{2} (114/sq mi)
- Time zone: UTC+01:00 (CET)
  - Summer (DST): UTC+02:00 (CEST)
- Postal codes: 19075
- Dialling codes: 038859
- Vehicle registration: LWL
- Website: www.amt-stralendorf.de

Warsow (German: [ˈvaɐ̯.zoː]) is a municipality in the Ludwigslust-Parchim district, in Mecklenburg-Vorpommern, Germany.
