= Zülow =

- Municipality
- Location of Zülow within Ludwigslust-Parchim district
- Interactive map of Zülow
- Location within Germany Location within Mecklenburg-Vorpommern
- Coordinates: 53°34′N 11°16′E
- Country: Germany
- State: Mecklenburg-Vorpommern
- District: Ludwigslust-Parchim
- Municipal assoc.: Stralendorf

Government
  - Mayor: Volker Schulz

Area
  - Total: 7.13 km^{2} (2.75 sq mi)
- Elevation: 49 m (161 ft)

Population (2025-12-31)
  - Total: 140
  - Density: 20/km^{2} (51/sq mi)
- Time zone: UTC+01:00 (CET)
  - Summer (DST): UTC+02:00 (CEST)
- Postal codes: 19073
- Dialling codes: 03869
- Vehicle registration: LWL
- Website: www.amt-stralendorf.de

Zülow (German pronunciation: [ˈtsyːloː]) is a municipality in the Ludwigslust-Parchim district, in Mecklenburg-Vorpommern, Germany.
