= Bresegard bei Picher =

- Municipality
- Flag Coat of arms

- Location of Bresegard bei Picher within Ludwigslust-Parchim district
- Interactive map of Bresegard bei Picher
- Location within Germany Location within Mecklenburg-Vorpommern
- Coordinates: 53°21′N 11°17′E
- Country: Germany
- State: Mecklenburg-Vorpommern
- District: Ludwigslust-Parchim
- Municipal assoc.: Hagenow-Land

Government
  - Mayor: Dr. Marianne Röckseisen (BfB)

Area
  - Total: 16.57 km^{2} (6.40 sq mi)
- Elevation: 37 m (121 ft)

Population (2025-12-31)
  - Total: 275
  - Density: 16.6/km^{2} (43.0/sq mi)
- Time zone: UTC+01:00 (CET)
  - Summer (DST): UTC+02:00 (CEST)
- Postal codes: 19230
- Dialling codes: 038751
- Vehicle registration: LWL
- Website: www.amt-hagenow-land.de

Bresegard bei Picher is a small municipality in the German state of Mecklenburg-Vorpommern. It is often simply refereed to as Bresegard but officially uses a proximity modifier due to another municipality of the same name, Bresegard bei Eldena, existing about 12 kilometres (7.5 mi) south of it. The addition 'bei Picher' in the name, signifies the municipality's proximity to the town of Picher, which it also borders to the east. Bresegard bei Picher, part of the Amt of Hagenow-Land and the district of Ludwigslust-Parchim, lies south of the main highway between Berlin and Hamburg, the A24.

== Geography ==
The municipality lies within the Griesen Gegend, in a region rich with forests between the Sude and Elde rivers. It borders Kuhstorf to the north, Strohkirchen to the northeast, Picher in the east, Alt Krenzlin to the southeast, Groß Krams to the southwest, and Redefin to the west.

== History ==
Mecklenburg had once been inhabited by Slavic peoples, and the suffix 'gard' in the name Bresegard reflects this. The place name, originally from the Slavic, later as 'Birkenbirge', and finally as Bresegard, had the root meaning of "birch tree mountain", which is reflected in the municipal coat of arms today. The first known mention of Bresegard was in 1421 by Albrecht V. of Mecklenburg-Schwerin in his compilation of land ownership, where the village was known as "Brezegure".

There are some indications that in the 15th and 16th centuries there may have been windmills in Bresegard. During the Thirty Years' War much of the area surrounding Bresegard was devastated. By the 17th and 18th centuries small farmers began to populate the area.

Bresegard bei Picher was part of the area initially captured or occupied by American troops at the end of World War II. Bresegard was on the American side of the line of contact between American and Soviet forces. Due to previous agreements by the Allied powers, this part of Germany was transferred to Soviet control several weeks after American occupation. As a small remote village, Bresegard did not suffer wartime destruction.

== Politics ==
=== Municipal council ===
The municipal council of Bresegard bei Picher has six seats, the 2024 Mecklenburg-Vorpommern local elections yielded the following result:

| Candidate | Party | Votes | % | +/- | Seats | +/- |
|---|---|---|---|---|---|---|
| Dr. Marianne Röckseisen | Bürger für Bresegard (BfB) | 295 | 50.60 | ▲4.82 | 3 | ▲1 |
| Sascha zur Kammer | Aktion Wählergemeinschaft für Bresegard | 288 | 49.40 | New | 3 | ▲3 |
| Valid votes | | 583 | 97.65 | unk. | | |
| Invalid votes | | 12 | 2.01 | ▼5.05 | | |
| Electorate/voter turnout | | 199 | 83.97 | ▼14.86 | | |
Source: Gemeindevertretungswahl Bresegard bei Picher 09.06.2024

=== Mayor ===
The mayor of Bresegard bei Picher is Dr. Marianne Röckseisen, who was reelected during the 2024 Mecklenburg-Vorpommern local elections as the sole candidate with 81.66% (138 votes), running for the local voters' association Citizen for Bresegard (Bürger für Bresegard). Röckseisen is also a member of the district council of Ludwigslust-Parchim, to which she was elected through the Free Horizon list and currently serves as a member of the BSW-FH faction.

List of mayors (incomplete):

- ?–2004: Renate Weber
- 2004–2015: Klaus Weinreich
- since 2015: Dr. Marianne Röckseisen (BfB)

=== Coat of arms and flag ===
The Bresegard crest depicts a birch tree on a mound, referencing the origins of the village name, adorned with nine seed pods to represent the number of historical settlement cores of the village. The arms were approved on 12 March 1998.

Blazon: "Shield Argent, issuant from base a mount Gules, topped by a birch Vert nine fold fruited Argent."

The flag is heraldic, showing the design of the coat of arms on a white background.
