= Kogel, Mecklenburg-Vorpommern =

- Municipality
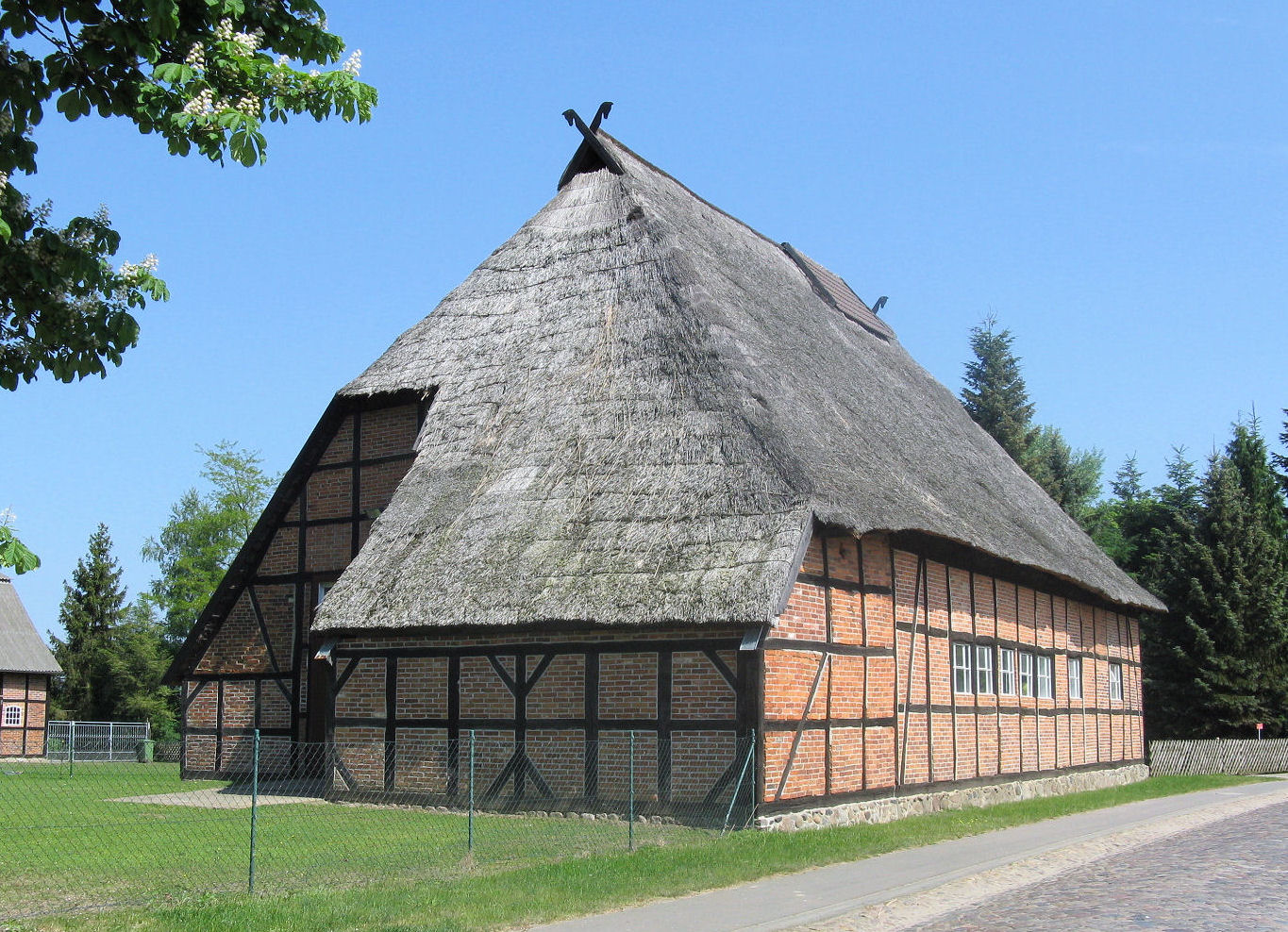
- Traditional house in Kogel

- Location of Kogel, Mecklenburg-Vorpommern within Ludwigslust-Parchim district
- Interactive map of Kogel, Mecklenburg-Vorpommern
- Location within Germany Location within Mecklenburg-Vorpommern
- Coordinates: 53°30′N 10°55′E
- Country: Germany
- State: Mecklenburg-Vorpommern
- District: Ludwigslust-Parchim
- Municipal assoc.: Zarrentin
- Subdivisions: 8

Government
  - Mayor: Herbert Wilke

Area
  - Total: 29.94 km^{2} (11.56 sq mi)
- Elevation: 30 m (98 ft)

Population (2025-12-31)
  - Total: 687
  - Density: 22.9/km^{2} (59.4/sq mi)
- Time zone: UTC+01:00 (CET)
  - Summer (DST): UTC+02:00 (CEST)
- Postal codes: 19246
- Dialling codes: 038843, 038851
- Vehicle registration: LWL
- Website: www.zarrentin.de

Kogel (German pronunciation: [ˈkoːɡl̩]) is a municipality in the Ludwigslust-Parchim district, in Mecklenburg-Vorpommern, Germany.
