= Schossin =

- Municipality
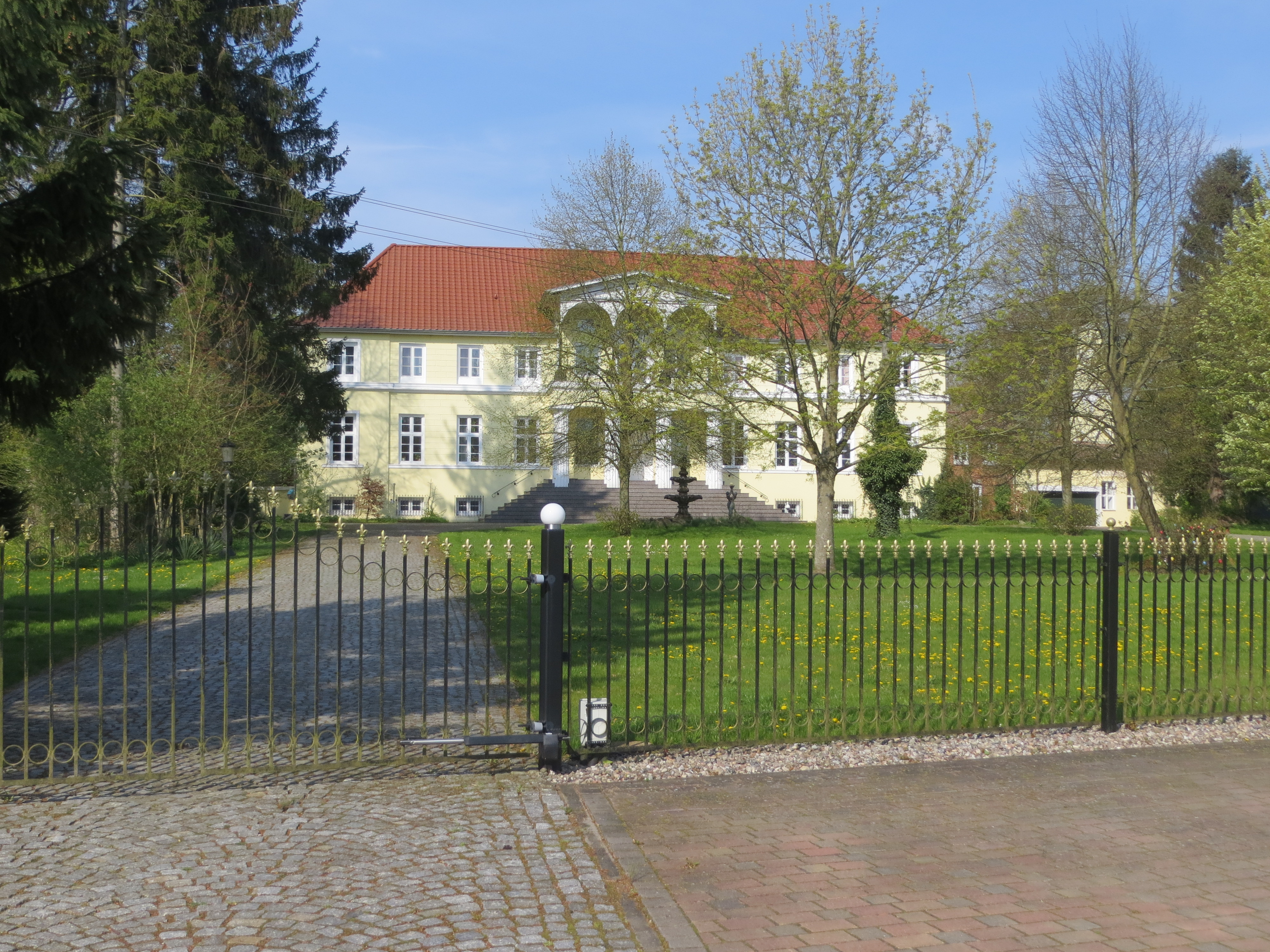
- Manor house in Schossin

- Location of Schossin within Ludwigslust-Parchim district
- Interactive map of Schossin
- Location within Germany Location within Mecklenburg-Vorpommern
- Coordinates: 53°32′N 11°13′E
- Country: Germany
- State: Mecklenburg-Vorpommern
- District: Ludwigslust-Parchim
- Municipal assoc.: Stralendorf
- Subdivisions: 2

Government
  - Mayor: Heiko Weiß

Area
  - Total: 11.41 km^{2} (4.41 sq mi)
- Elevation: 39 m (128 ft)

Population (2025-12-31)
  - Total: 236
  - Density: 20.7/km^{2} (53.6/sq mi)
- Time zone: UTC+01:00 (CET)
  - Summer (DST): UTC+02:00 (CEST)
- Postal codes: 19073
- Dialling codes: 03869, 03850, 03859
- Vehicle registration: LWL
- Website: www.amt-stralendorf.de

Schossin is a municipality in the Ludwigslust-Parchim district, in Mecklenburg-Vorpommern, Germany.
