= Kirch Jesar =

- Municipality
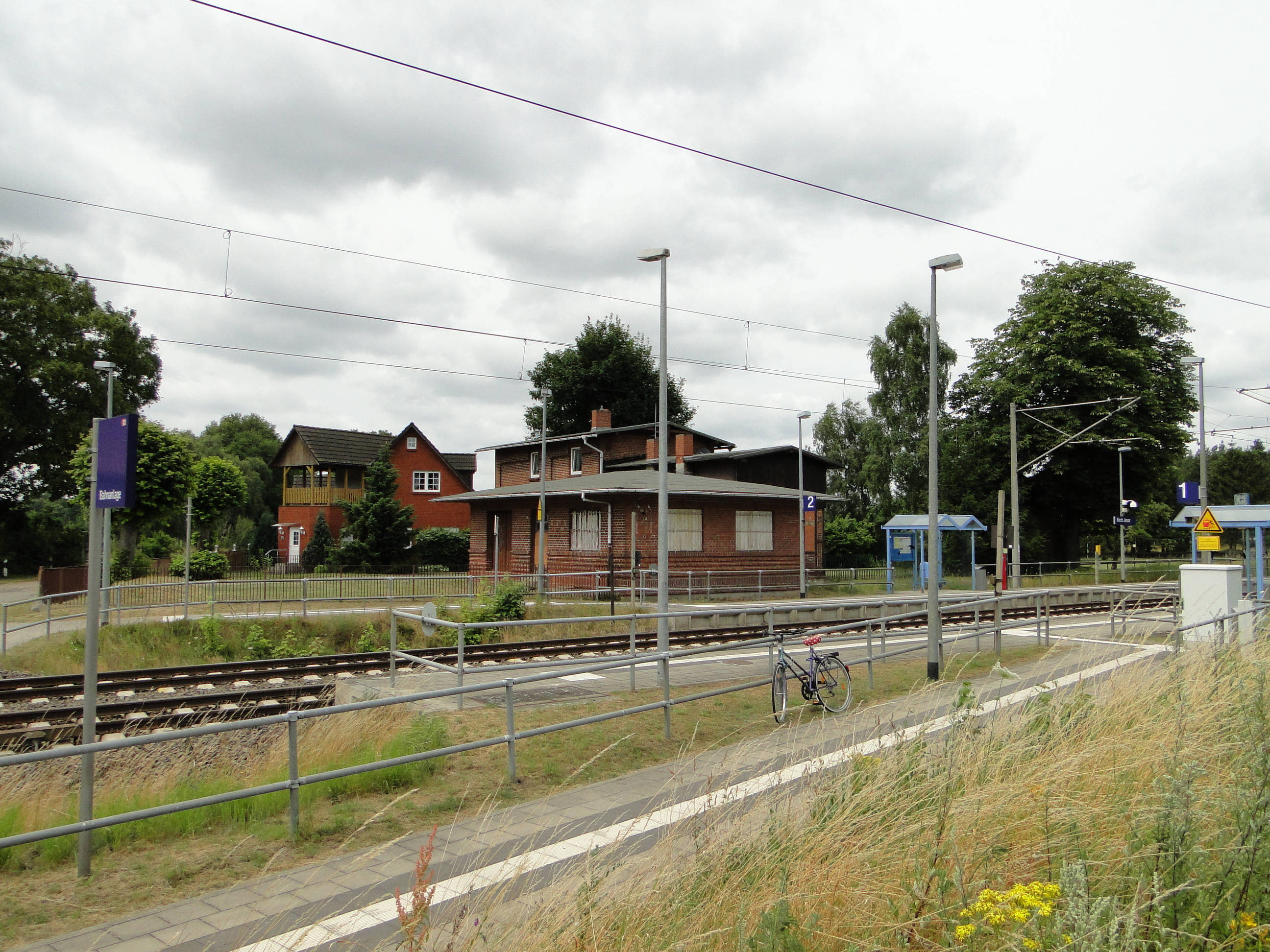
- Train station in Kirch Jesar

- Coat of arms

- Location of Kirch Jesar within Ludwigslust-Parchim district
- Interactive map of Kirch Jesar
- Location within Germany Location within Mecklenburg-Vorpommern
- Coordinates: 53°26′40″N 11°16′15″E
- Country: Germany
- State: Mecklenburg-Vorpommern
- District: Ludwigslust-Parchim
- Municipal assoc.: Hagenow-Land
- Subdivisions: 2

Government
  - Mayor: Bernhard Ritzmann

Area
  - Total: 18.76 km^{2} (7.24 sq mi)
- Elevation: 22 m (72 ft)

Population (2025-12-31)
  - Total: 661
  - Density: 35.2/km^{2} (91.3/sq mi)
- Time zone: UTC+01:00 (CET)
  - Summer (DST): UTC+02:00 (CEST)
- Postal codes: 19230
- Dialling codes: 03883
- Vehicle registration: LWL
- Website: www.amt-hagenow-land.de

Kirch Jesar is a municipality in the Ludwigslust-Parchim district, in Mecklenburg-Vorpommern, Germany. The village was first mentioned in 1371.
