= Gammelin =

- Municipality
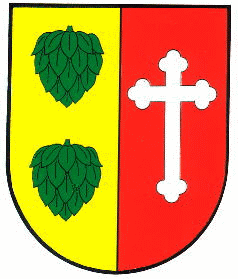
- Coat of arms

- Location of Gammelin within Ludwigslust-Parchim district
- Interactive map of Gammelin
- Location within Germany Location within Mecklenburg-Vorpommern
- Coordinates: 53°30′N 11°13′E
- Country: Germany
- State: Mecklenburg-Vorpommern
- District: Ludwigslust-Parchim
- Municipal assoc.: Hagenow-Land
- Subdivisions: 2

Government
  - Mayor: Manfred Kebschull

Area
  - Total: 15.62 km^{2} (6.03 sq mi)
- Elevation: 50 m (160 ft)

Population (2025-12-31)
  - Total: 479
  - Density: 30.7/km^{2} (79.4/sq mi)
- Time zone: UTC+01:00 (CET)
  - Summer (DST): UTC+02:00 (CEST)
- Postal codes: 19230
- Dialling codes: 038850
- Vehicle registration: LWL
- Website: www.amt-hagenow-land.de

Gammelin is a municipality in the administrative the Ludwigslust-Parchim district, in Mecklenburg-Vorpommern, Germany. The municipality is administered by the Ludwigslust district office of Hagenow Land, which is situated in Hagenow.

Gammelin is also administered in conjunction with the neighbouring village of Backendorf.

== Geography ==
Gammelin is located between the town of Hagenow to the south and the state capital of Schwerin to the north. The A24 motorway (Bundesautobahn 24) runs south of the village, approximately 2.5 kilometers away and the B321 main road (Bundesstraße 321) runs approximately 3 kilometers to the east.

== History ==
Gammelin is first listed in a document from 1219 as Chemelin; the village church is mentioned in records as early as 1335. During the Thirty Years' War, the population suffered. However, the end of the Second World War brought evacuees to the village, displaced people and the rural poor peasants who were allocated land during agrarian reforms. This land was compulsorily collectively farmed, in much the same as land was organized in the DDR.

The coat of arms was approved by the Interior Minister on 21 August 1997, and was registered as number 135 on the MV coat of arms roll. The coat of arms was designed by Manfred Sturzenbecher.

== Community ==
Predominantly activities within the municipality take place in the district of Gammelin. The sportsclub (Gammelin Wild Ducks) meet here, in addition to the village club which regularly organizes events. The district's elderly also meet in Gammelin's parish house for coffee and cake. The church is important in shaping the life of the district.

== Sights and Monuments ==
- Brick Church in Gammelin
- Cobbled Chapel in Backendorf
- A once circular barn in Bakendorf
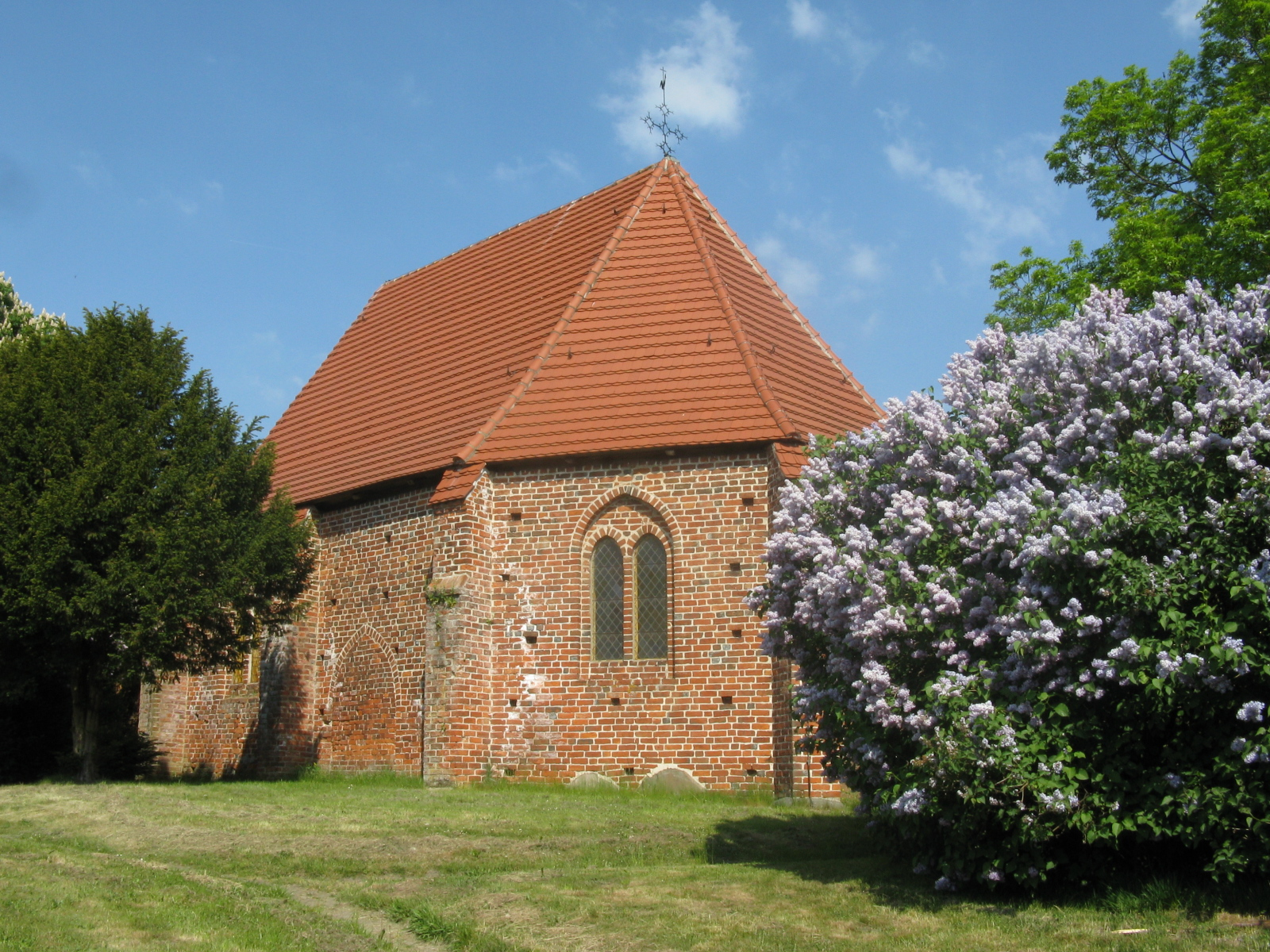
Brick Church, Gammelin

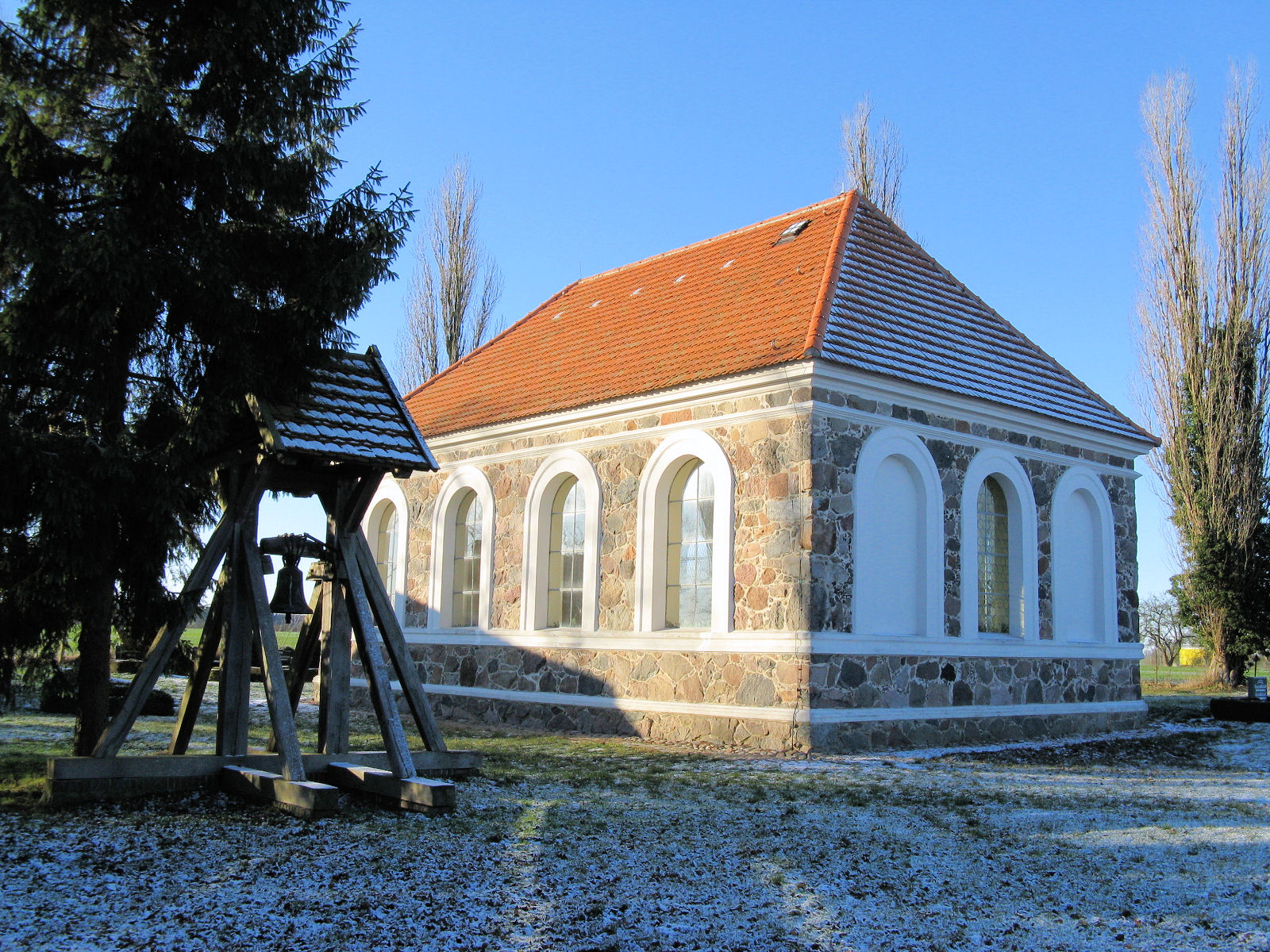
Village Chapel, Bakendorf

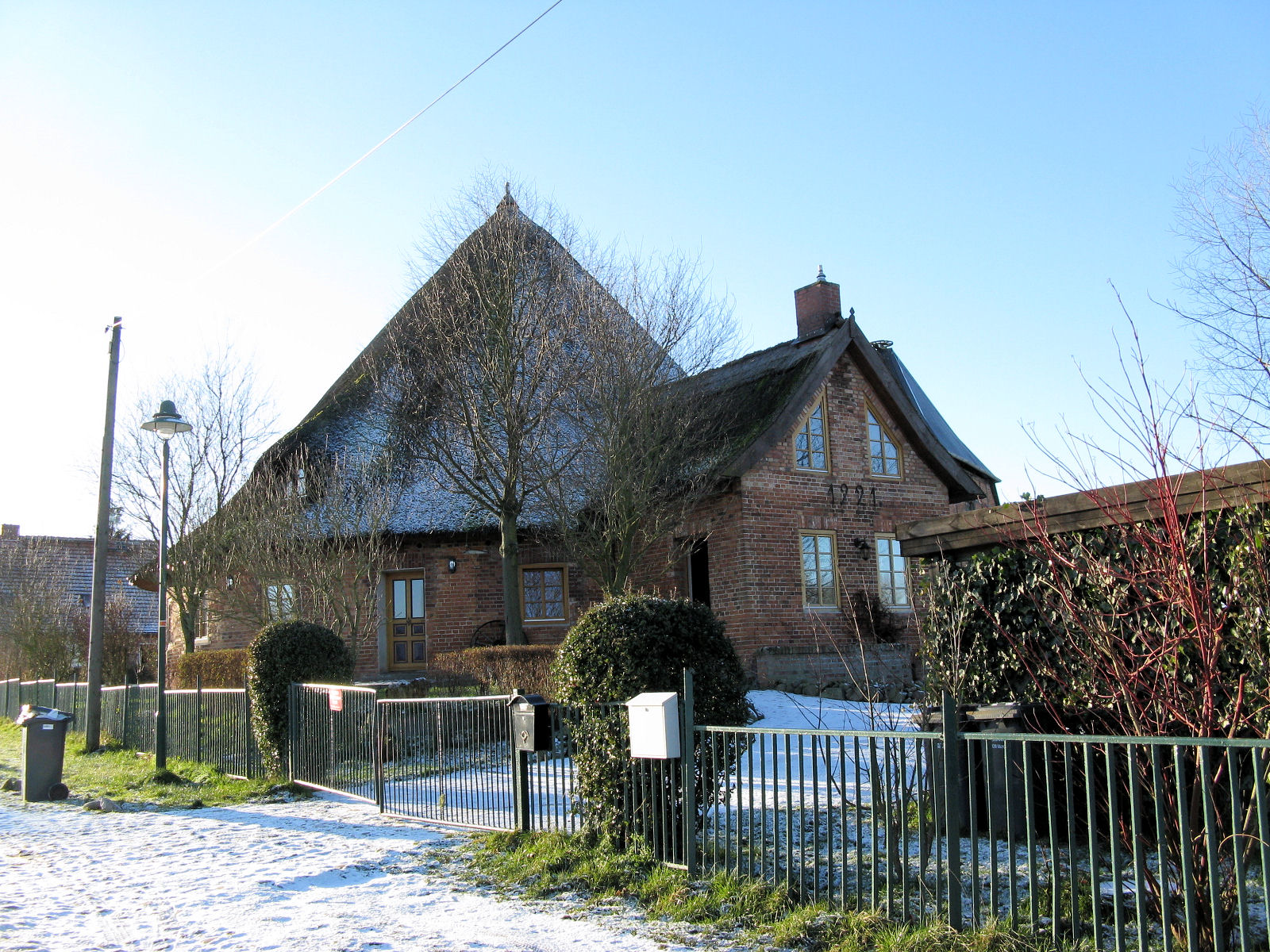
A once circular barn, Bakendorf

District monuments are listed in the list of historical buildings in Gammelin.

== Events ==
The municipality possesses a volunteer fire brigade which is formed by 20 active members who sit together with other volunteer groups. The fire brigade forms a central point in community life and organizes each year a blood donation. Since 2004 there has existed a friendship with the volunteer fire brigade of Berlin- Schönefeld. Through regular meetings and excursions, the relationship became an official, formal partnership.
