= Pätow-Steegen =

- Municipality
- Coat of arms

- Location of Pätow-Steegen within Ludwigslust-Parchim district
- Interactive map of Pätow-Steegen
- Location within Germany Location within Mecklenburg-Vorpommern
- Coordinates: 53°24′N 11°07′E
- Country: Germany
- State: Mecklenburg-Vorpommern
- District: Ludwigslust-Parchim
- Municipal assoc.: Hagenow-Land
- Subdivisions: 3

Government
  - Mayor: Ernst-Adolf Zengel

Area
  - Total: 10.66 km^{2} (4.12 sq mi)
- Elevation: 35 m (115 ft)

Population (2025-12-31)
  - Total: 397
  - Density: 37.2/km^{2} (96.5/sq mi)
- Time zone: UTC+01:00 (CET)
  - Summer (DST): UTC+02:00 (CEST)
- Postal codes: 19230
- Dialling codes: 03883
- Vehicle registration: LWL
- Website: www.amt-hagenow-land.de

Pätow-Steegen is a municipality in the Ludwigslust-Parchim district, in Mecklenburg-Vorpommern, Germany.
