= Alt Zachun =

- Municipality
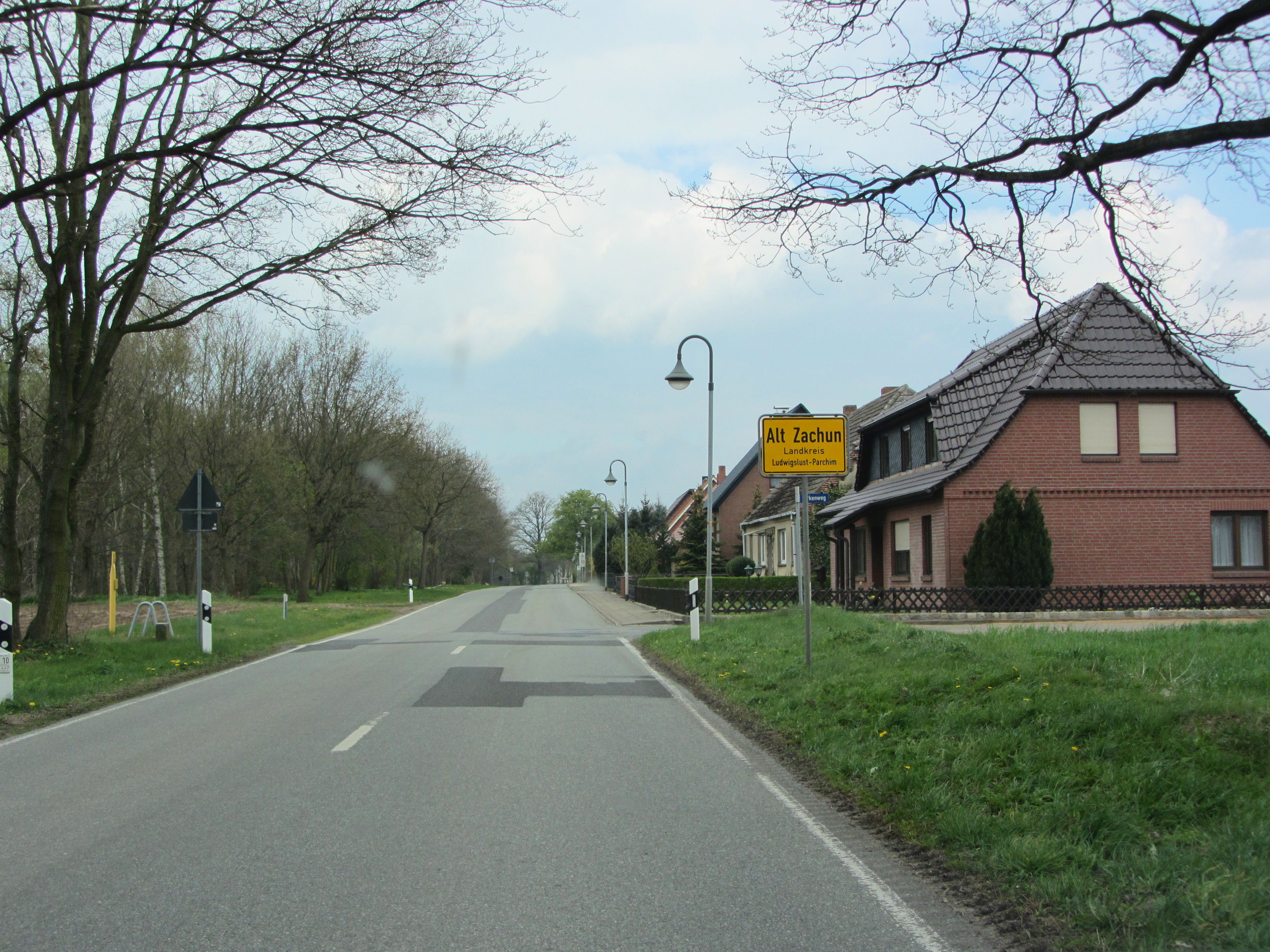
- Alt Zachun

- Coat of arms

- Location of Alt Zachun within Ludwigslust-Parchim district
- Interactive map of Alt Zachun
- Location within Germany Location within Mecklenburg-Vorpommern
- Coordinates: 53°29′N 11°20′E
- Country: Germany
- State: Mecklenburg-Vorpommern
- District: Ludwigslust-Parchim
- Municipal assoc.: Hagenow-Land

Government
  - Mayor: Volker Klemz

Area
  - Total: 8.43 km^{2} (3.25 sq mi)
- Elevation: 37 m (121 ft)

Population (2025-12-31)
  - Total: 349
  - Density: 41.4/km^{2} (107/sq mi)
- Time zone: UTC+01:00 (CET)
  - Summer (DST): UTC+02:00 (CEST)
- Postal codes: 19230
- Dialling codes: 038859
- Vehicle registration: LUP, HGN, LBZ, LWL, PCH, STB
- Website: www.amt-hagenow-land.de

Alt Zachun is a municipality in the Ludwigslust-Parchim district, in Mecklenburg-Vorpommern, Germany.
