= Hagenow-Land =

- Amt
- Map of Ludwigslust-Parchim highlighting Hagenow-Land
- Interactive map of Hagenow-Land
- Location within Germany Location within Mecklenburg-Vorpommern
- Coordinates: 53°25′N 11°11′E
- Country: Germany
- State: Mecklenburg-Vorpommern
- District: Ludwigslust-Parchim
- Seat: Hagenow
- Subdivisions: 19 municipalities

Area
  - Total: 336.65 km^{2} (129.98 sq mi)

Population (2025-12-31)
  - Total: 8,370
  - Density: 24.9/km^{2} (64.4/sq mi)
- Time zone: UTC+01:00 (CET)
  - Summer (DST): UTC+02:00 (CEST)
- Website: www.amt-hagenow-land.de

Hagenow-Land is an Amt in the Ludwigslust-Parchim district, in Mecklenburg-Vorpommern, Germany. The seat of the Amt is in Hagenow, itself not part of the Amt.

The Amt Hagenow-Land consists of the following municipalities:

1. Alt Zachun
2. Bandenitz
3. Belsch
4. Bobzin
5. Bresegard bei Picher
6. Gammelin
7. Groß Krams
8. Hoort
9. Hülseburg
10. Kirch Jesar
11. Kuhstorf
12. Moraas
13. Pätow-Steegen
14. Picher
15. Pritzier
16. Redefin
17. Strohkirchen
18. Toddin
19. Warlitz
