= Dersenow =

- Municipality
- Location of Dersenow within Ludwigslust-Parchim district
- Interactive map of Dersenow
- Location within Germany Location within Mecklenburg-Vorpommern
- Coordinates: 53°22′N 10°52′E
- Country: Germany
- State: Mecklenburg-Vorpommern
- District: Ludwigslust-Parchim
- Municipal assoc.: Boizenburg-Land
- Subdivisions: 5

Government
  - Mayor: Gunnar Abel

Area
  - Total: 22.51 km^{2} (8.69 sq mi)
- Elevation: 19 m (62 ft)

Population (2025-12-31)
  - Total: 432
  - Density: 19.2/km^{2} (49.7/sq mi)
- Time zone: UTC+01:00 (CET)
  - Summer (DST): UTC+02:00 (CEST)
- Postal codes: 19260
- Dialling codes: 038844, 038848
- Vehicle registration: LWL
- Website: www.amtboizenburgland.de

Dersenow is a municipality in the Ludwigslust-Parchim district, in Mecklenburg-Vorpommern, Germany.
