= Tessin bei Boizenburg =

- Municipality
- Location of Tessin bei Boizenburg within Ludwigslust-Parchim district
- Interactive map of Tessin bei Boizenburg
- Location within Germany Location within Mecklenburg-Vorpommern
- Coordinates: 53°24′N 10°51′E
- Country: Germany
- State: Mecklenburg-Vorpommern
- District: Ludwigslust-Parchim
- Municipal assoc.: Boizenburg-Land
- Subdivisions: 3

Government
  - Mayor: Gertrud Geistlinger

Area
  - Total: 10.26 km^{2} (3.96 sq mi)
- Elevation: 15 m (49 ft)

Population (2025-12-31)
  - Total: 376
  - Density: 36.6/km^{2} (94.9/sq mi)
- Time zone: UTC+01:00 (CET)
  - Summer (DST): UTC+02:00 (CEST)
- Postal codes: 19258
- Dialling codes: 038844
- Vehicle registration: LWL
- Website: www.amtboizenburgland.de

Tessin bei Boizenburg is a municipality in the Ludwigslust-Parchim district, in Mecklenburg-Vorpommern, Germany.
