= Warlitz =

- Municipality
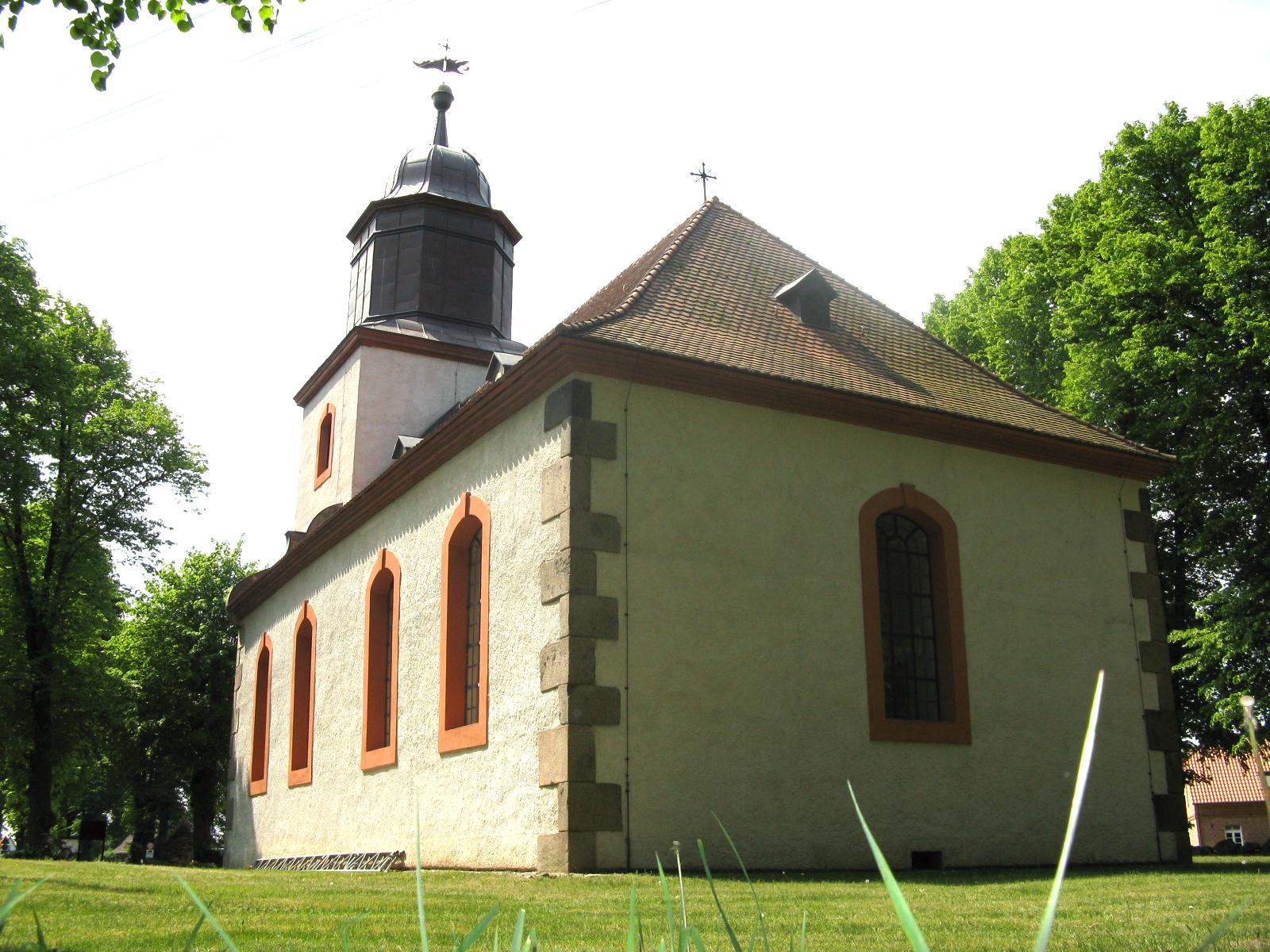
- Church in Warlitz

- Location of Warlitz within Ludwigslust-Parchim district
- Interactive map of Warlitz
- Location within Germany Location within Mecklenburg-Vorpommern
- Coordinates: 53°22′N 11°08′E
- Country: Germany
- State: Mecklenburg-Vorpommern
- District: Ludwigslust-Parchim
- Municipal assoc.: Hagenow-Land
- Subdivisions: 2

Government
  - Mayor: Wolfgang Vogel

Area
  - Total: 23.73 km^{2} (9.16 sq mi)
- Elevation: 16 m (52 ft)

Population (2025-12-31)
  - Total: 450
  - Density: 19/km^{2} (49/sq mi)
- Time zone: UTC+01:00 (CET)
  - Summer (DST): UTC+02:00 (CEST)
- Postal codes: 19230
- Dialling codes: 038856
- Vehicle registration: LWL
- Website: www.amt-hagenow-land.de

Warlitz is a municipality in the Ludwigslust-Parchim district, in Mecklenburg-Vorpommern, Germany.
