= Bengerstorf =

- Municipality
- Location of Bengerstorf within Ludwigslust-Parchim district
- Interactive map of Bengerstorf
- Location within Germany Location within Mecklenburg-Vorpommern
- Coordinates: 53°25′N 10°51′E
- Country: Germany
- State: Mecklenburg-Vorpommern
- District: Ludwigslust-Parchim
- Municipal assoc.: Boizenburg-Land
- Subdivisions: 5

Government
  - Mayor: Günter Meyer

Area
  - Total: 32.78 km^{2} (12.66 sq mi)
- Elevation: 15 m (49 ft)

Population (2025-12-31)
  - Total: 503
  - Density: 15.3/km^{2} (39.7/sq mi)
- Time zone: UTC+01:00 (CET)
  - Summer (DST): UTC+02:00 (CEST)
- Postal codes: 19258
- Dialling codes: 038842, 038843, 038844, 038847
- Vehicle registration: LWL
- Website: www.amtboizenburgland.de

Bengerstorf is a municipality in the Ludwigslust-Parchim district, in Mecklenburg-Vorpommern, Germany.
