= Hülseburg =

- Municipality
- Location of Hülseburg within Ludwigslust-Parchim district
- Interactive map of Hülseburg
- Location within Germany Location within Mecklenburg-Vorpommern
- Coordinates: 53°30′N 11°11′E
- Country: Germany
- State: Mecklenburg-Vorpommern
- District: Ludwigslust-Parchim
- Municipal assoc.: Hagenow-Land
- Subdivisions: 2

Government
  - Mayor: Brigitte Wolf

Area
  - Total: 9.09 km^{2} (3.51 sq mi)
- Elevation: 47 m (154 ft)

Population (2025-12-31)
  - Total: 150
  - Density: 17/km^{2} (43/sq mi)
- Time zone: UTC+01:00 (CET)
  - Summer (DST): UTC+02:00 (CEST)
- Postal codes: 19230
- Dialling codes: 038850
- Vehicle registration: LWL
- Website: www.amt-hagenow-land.de

Hülseburg is a municipality in the Ludwigslust-Parchim district, in Mecklenburg-Vorpommern, Germany.
