= Belsch =

- Municipality
- Coat of arms

- Location of Belsch within Ludwigslust-Parchim district
- Interactive map of Belsch
- Location within Germany Location within Mecklenburg-Vorpommern
- Coordinates: 53°19′N 11°11′E
- Country: Germany
- State: Mecklenburg-Vorpommern
- District: Ludwigslust-Parchim
- Municipal assoc.: Hagenow-Land
- Subdivisions: 2

Government
  - Mayor: Dieter Friedrichs

Area
  - Total: 22.59 km^{2} (8.72 sq mi)
- Elevation: 19 m (62 ft)

Population (2025-12-31)
  - Total: 212
  - Density: 9.38/km^{2} (24.3/sq mi)
- Time zone: UTC+01:00 (CET)
  - Summer (DST): UTC+02:00 (CEST)
- Postal codes: 19230
- Dialling codes: 038854
- Vehicle registration: LWL
- Website: www.amt-hagenow-land.de

Belsch (German pronunciation: [bɛlʃ]) is a municipality in the Ludwigslust-Parchim district, in Mecklenburg-Vorpommern, Germany.
