= Moraas =

- Municipality
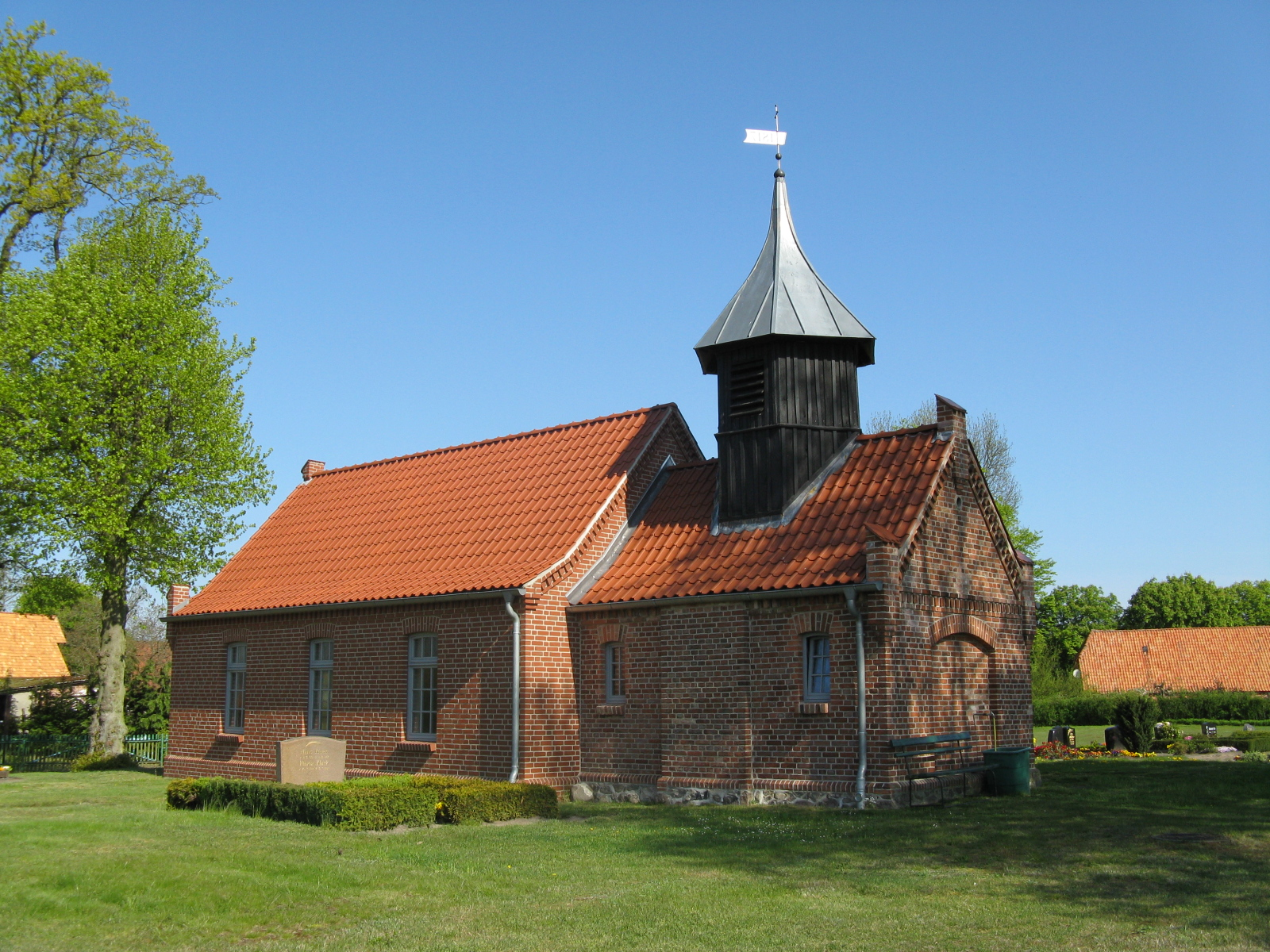
- Church in Moraas

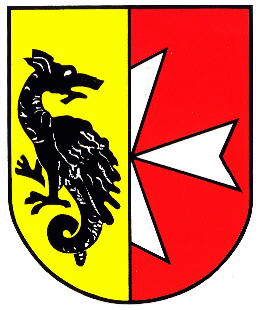
- Coat of arms

- Location of Moraas within Ludwigslust-Parchim district
- Interactive map of Moraas
- Location within Germany Location within Mecklenburg-Vorpommern
- Coordinates: 53°25′N 11°17′E
- Country: Germany
- State: Mecklenburg-Vorpommern
- District: Ludwigslust-Parchim
- Municipal assoc.: Hagenow-Land

Government
  - Mayor: Erwin Konrad

Area
  - Total: 16.78 km^{2} (6.48 sq mi)
- Elevation: 24 m (79 ft)

Population (2025-12-31)
  - Total: 469
  - Density: 27.9/km^{2} (72.4/sq mi)
- Time zone: UTC+01:00 (CET)
  - Summer (DST): UTC+02:00 (CEST)
- Postal codes: 19230
- Dialling codes: 03883
- Vehicle registration: LWL
- Website: www.amt-hagenow-land.de

Moraas is a municipality in the Ludwigslust-Parchim district, in Mecklenburg-Vorpommern, Germany.
