= Parchim (district) =

Coordinates: 53°30′N 11°55′E

- District
- Flag Coat of arms

- Country: Germany
- State: Mecklenburg-Western Pomerania
- Disbanded: 2011
- Capital: Parchim

Area
  - Total: 2,233 km^{2} (862 sq mi)

Population (2010)
  - Total: 95,798
  - Density: 43/km^{2} (110/sq mi)
- Time zone: UTC+01:00 (CET)
  - Summer (DST): UTC+02:00 (CEST)
- Vehicle registration: PCH
- Website: landkreis-parchim.de

Parchim is a former Kreis (district) in the southwestern part of Mecklenburg-Western Pomerania, Germany. Neighboring districts were (from the north clockwise) Nordwestmecklenburg, Güstrow, Müritz, the district Prignitz in Brandenburg, the district Ludwigslust and the district-free city Schwerin. The district was disbanded at the district reform of September 2011. Its territory has been part of the Ludwigslust-Parchim district since.

== Geography ==
Most of the district is now agriculturally used, but in the easternmost part there are several lakes, the largest of them being the Plauer See (39 km^{2}). The Plauer See marks the western end of the Müritz lakeland.

== History ==
In 1994 the three districts of Parchim, Sternberg and Lübz were merged into the enlarged district of Parchim. The borders of this new district were roughly identical with the medieval principality of Parchim-Riechenberg, which existed between 1238 and 1316. This district was merged with the district of Ludwigslust at the district reform of September 2011, forming the new Ludwigslust-Parchim district.

== Coat of arms ==
The coat of arms shows a bull's head, which is both the symbol of the former Estate of Parchim, as well as of Mecklenburg into which it was incorporated in 1471. The two blue corners symbolize the two biggest lakes of the district - the Schweriner See and the Plauer See.

== Towns and municipalities ==
The subdivisions of the district were (situation August 2011):

Amt-free town
1. Parchim

Ämter
1. Banzkow; 1. Banzkow^{1}; 2. Plate; 3. Sukow; 2. Crivitz; 1. Barnin; 2. Bülow; 3. Crivitz^{1, 2}; 4. Demen; 5. Friedrichsruhe; 6. Tramm; 7. Zapel; 3. Eldenburg Lübz; 1. Gallin-Kuppentin; 2. Gischow; 3. Granzin; 4. Herzberg^{3}; 5. Karbow-Vietlübbe^{3}; 6. Kreien; 7. Kritzow; 8. Lübz^{1, 2}; 9. Lutheran^{3}; 10. Marnitz; 11. Passow; 12. Siggelkow; 13. Suckow; 14. Tessenow; 15. Wahlstorf^{3}; 16. Werder	4. Goldberg-Mildenitz; 1. Diestelow^{3}; 2. Dobbertin; 3. Goldberg^{1, 2}; 4. Mestlin; 5. Neu Poserin; 6. Techentin; 7. Wendisch Waren; 5. Ostufer Schweriner See; 1. Cambs; 2. Dobin am See; 3. Gneven; 4. Godern^{3}; 5. Langen Brütz; 6. Leezen^{1}; 7. Pinnow; 8. Raben Steinfeld; 6. Parchimer Umland (seat: Parchim); 1. Damm^{3}; 2. Domsühl; 3. Grebbin^{3}; 4. Groß Godems; 5. Groß Niendorf^{3}; 6. Karrenzin; 7. Lewitzrand; 8. Rom; 9. Severin^{3}; 10. Spornitz; 11. Stolpe; 12. Ziegendorf; 13. Zölkow	7. Plau am See; 1. Barkhagen; 2. Buchberg^{3}; 3. Ganzlin; 4. Plau am See^{1, 2}; 5. Wendisch Priborn^{3}; 8. Sternberger Seenlandschaft; 1. Blankenberg; 2. Borkow; 3. Brüel^{2}; 4. Dabel; 5. Hohen Pritz; 6. Kobrow; 7. Kuhlen-Wendorf; 8. Langen Jarchow^{3}; 9. Mustin; 10. Sternberg^{1, 2}; 11. Weitendorf; 12. Witzin; 13. Zahrensdorf^{3}
^{1} - seat of the Amt; ^{2} - town; ^{3} - former town/municipality
