= Ostufer Schweriner See =

Coordinates: 53.650°N 11.583°E

Ostufer Schweriner See is a former Amt in the Ludwigslust-Parchim district, in Mecklenburg-Vorpommern, Germany. It was named after Lake Schwerin. The seat of the Amt was in Leezen. It was disbanded on 1 January 2014, when its members joined the Amt Crivitz.

The Amt Ostufer Schweriner See consisted of the following municipalities:

1. Cambs
2. Dobin am See
3. Gneven
4. Langen Brütz
5. Leezen
6. Pinnow
7. Raben Steinfeld
