= Banzkow (Amt) =

Coordinates: 53.533°N 11.517°E

Banzkow is a former Amt in the Ludwigslust-Parchim district, in Mecklenburg-Vorpommern, Germany. The seat of the Amt was in Banzkow. It was disbanded on 1 January 2014, when its members joined the Amt Crivitz.

The Amt Banzkow consisted of the following municipalities:

1. Banzkow
2. Plate
3. Sukow
