= Pinnow =

Pinnow may refer to the following places in Germany:

- Pinnow, Brandenburg
- Pinnow, Mecklenburg-Vorpommern
