= Wendisch Priborn =

- Ortsteil of Ganzlin
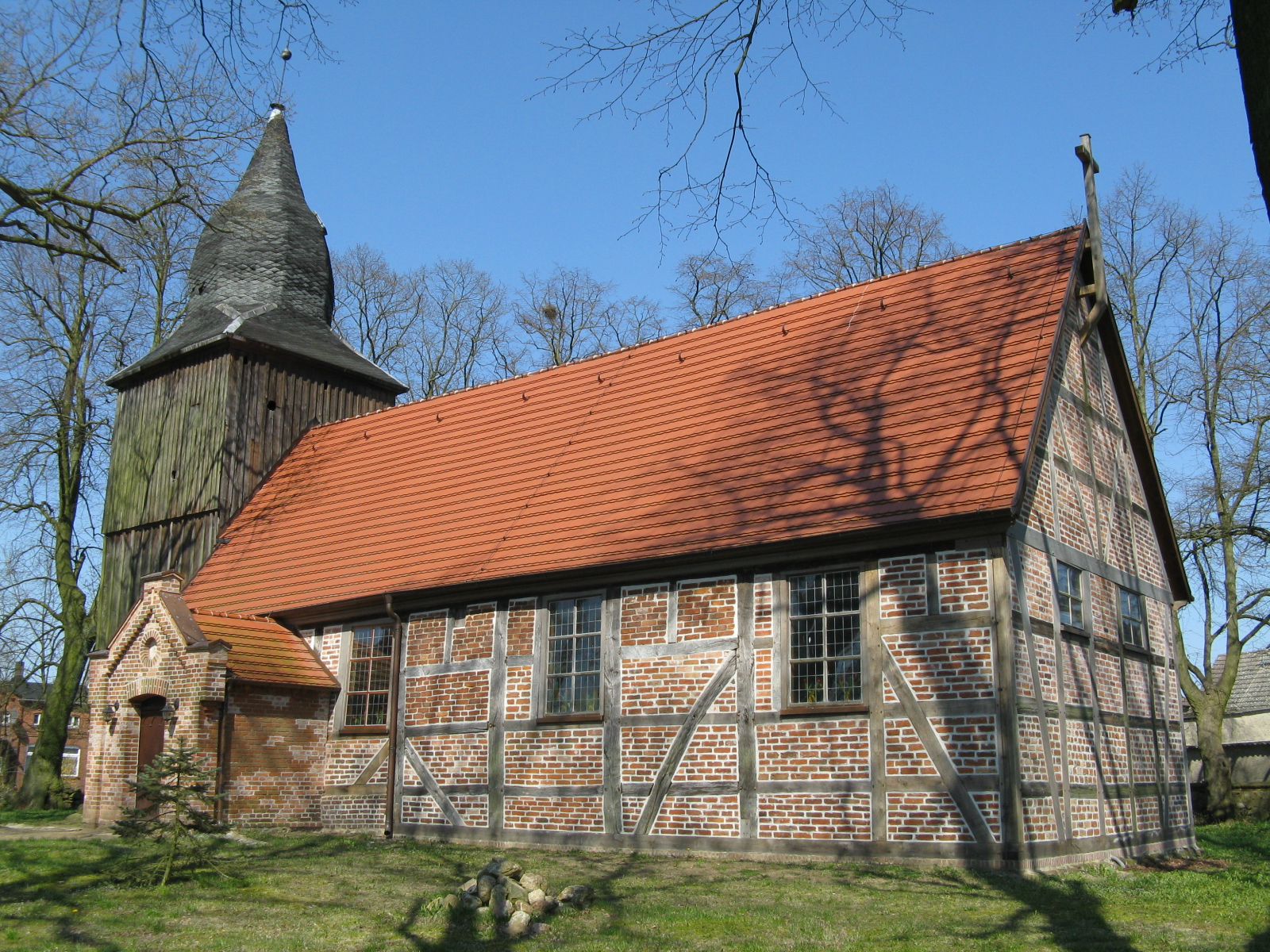
- Church
- Interactive map of Wendisch Priborn
- Location within Germany Location within Mecklenburg-Vorpommern
- Coordinates: 53°20′20″N 12°16′12″E
- Country: Germany
- State: Mecklenburg-Vorpommern
- District: Ludwigslust-Parchim
- Municipality: Ganzlin

Area
  - Total: 26.76 km^{2} (10.33 sq mi)
- Elevation: 93 m (305 ft)

Population (2012-12-31)
  - Total: 448
  - Density: 16.7/km^{2} (43.4/sq mi)
- Time zone: UTC+01:00 (CET)
  - Summer (DST): UTC+02:00 (CEST)
- Postal codes: 19395
- Dialling codes: 038737
- Vehicle registration: PCH
- Website: www.amtplau.de

Wendisch Priborn (German pronunciation: [ˈvɛndɪʃ ˈpʁiːbɔʁn]) is a village and a former municipality in the Ludwigslust-Parchim district, in Mecklenburg-Vorpommern, Germany. Since 25 May 2014, it is part of the municipality Ganzlin.
