= Buchberg, Mecklenburg-Vorpommern =

Buchberg
- Ortsteil of Ganzlin
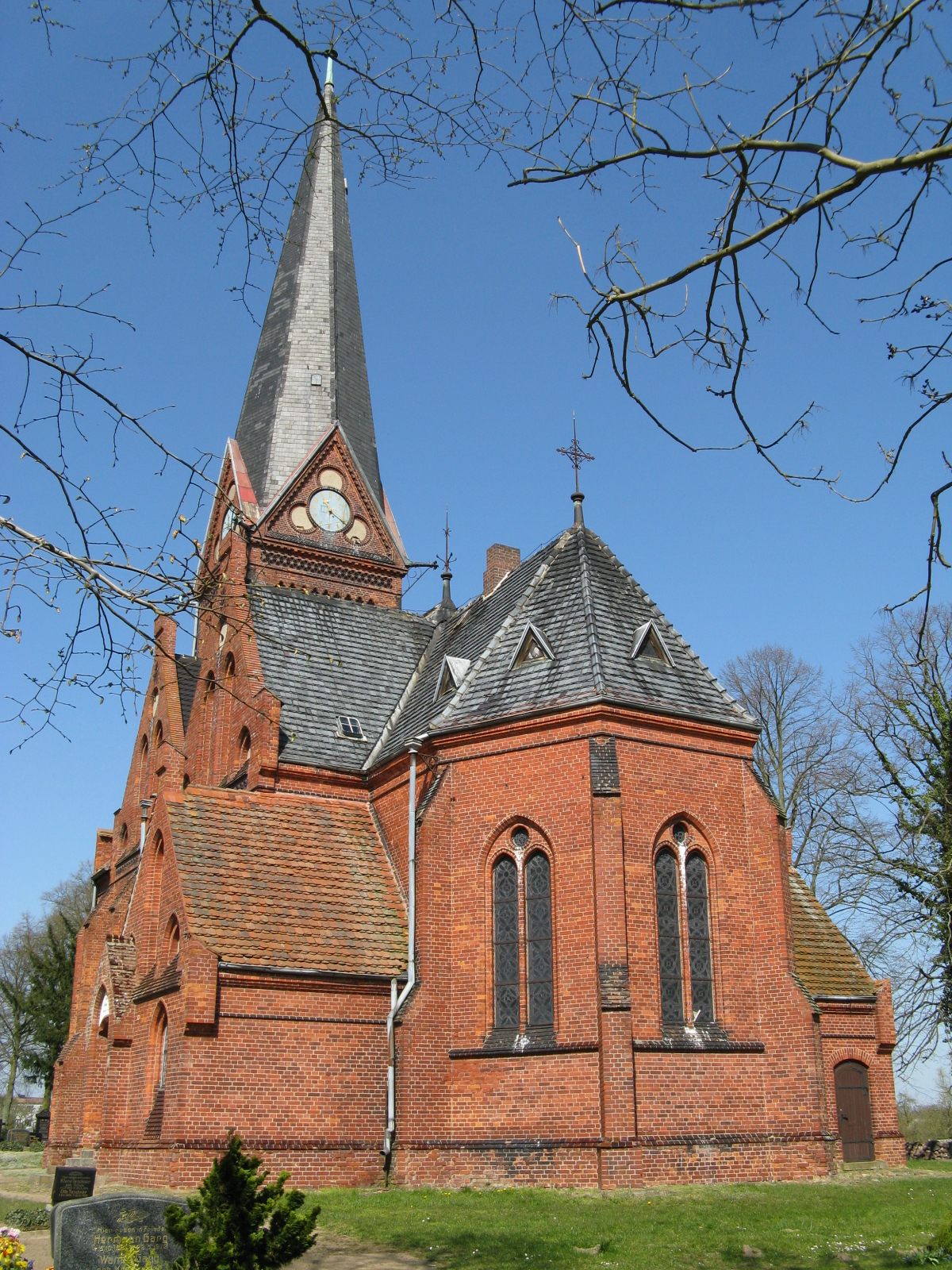
- Church

- Coat of arms
- Interactive map of Buchberg
- Location within Germany Location within Mecklenburg-Vorpommern
- Coordinates: 53°23′N 12°12′E
- Country: Germany
- State: Mecklenburg-Vorpommern
- District: Ludwigslust-Parchim
- Municipality: Ganzlin

Area
  - Total: 46.36 km^{2} (17.90 sq mi)
- Elevation: 95 m (312 ft)

Population (2012-12-31)
  - Total: 494
  - Density: 10.7/km^{2} (27.6/sq mi)
- Time zone: UTC+01:00 (CET)
  - Summer (DST): UTC+02:00 (CEST)
- Postal codes: 19395
- Dialling codes: 038737
- Vehicle registration: PCH
- Website: www.amtplau.de

Buchberg (German pronunciation: [ˈbuːxˌbɛʁk]) is a village and a former municipality in the Ludwigslust-Parchim district, in Mecklenburg-Vorpommern, Germany. Since 25 May 2014, it is part of the municipality Ganzlin.
