= Godern =

- Ortsteil of Pinnow
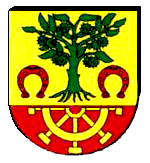
- Coat of arms
- Interactive map of Godern
- Location within Germany Location within Mecklenburg-Vorpommern
- Coordinates: 53°37′N 11°33′E
- Country: Germany
- State: Mecklenburg-Vorpommern
- District: Ludwigslust-Parchim
- Municipality: Pinnow
- Subdivisions: 2 Ortsteile

Area
  - Total: 4.59 km^{2} (1.77 sq mi)
- Elevation: 40 m (130 ft)

Population (2010-12-31)
  - Total: 328
  - Density: 71.5/km^{2} (185/sq mi)
- Time zone: UTC+01:00 (CET)
  - Summer (DST): UTC+02:00 (CEST)
- Postal codes: 19067
- Dialling codes: 03860
- Vehicle registration: PCH
- Website: www.godern-online.de

Godern is a village and a former municipality in the Ludwigslust-Parchim district, in Mecklenburg-Vorpommern, Germany. Since 1 January 2012, it is part of the municipality Pinnow.
