= Diestelow =

- Ortsteil of Goldberg
- Interactive map of Diestelow
- Location within Germany Location within Mecklenburg-Vorpommern
- Coordinates: 53°32′N 12°04′E
- Country: Germany
- State: Mecklenburg-Vorpommern
- District: Ludwigslust-Parchim
- Town: Goldberg
- Subdivisions: 4

Area
  - Total: 23.46 km^{2} (9.06 sq mi)
- Elevation: 55 m (180 ft)

Population (2010-12-31)
  - Total: 468
  - Density: 19.9/km^{2} (51.7/sq mi)
- Time zone: UTC+01:00 (CET)
  - Summer (DST): UTC+02:00 (CEST)
- Postal codes: 19399
- Dialling codes: 038736
- Vehicle registration: PCH
- Website: http://www.amt-mildenitz.de/

Diestelow is a village and a former municipality in the Ludwigslust-Parchim district, in Mecklenburg-Vorpommern, Germany. Since 1 January 2012, it is part of the town Goldberg.
