= Zarchlin =

Village in Mecklenburg-Vorpommern, Germany

Coordinates: 53°31′08″N 12°13′23″E

The village of Zarchlin is located in the Federal State of Mecklenburg-Western Pomerania in the north of Germany. It is part of the district of Ludwigslust-Parchim and belongs to the municipality of Barkhagen. About 100 people live in Zarchlin on an area of about 17.5 ha.

== History ==
Zarchlin was first documented in 1253 and at that time still bore the name "Zochelin". Until 1552 the village belonged to Dobbertin Abbey, a Cistercian monastery.

In 1591 it was mentioned in writing that there was a chapel in Zarchlin. It was a half-timbered building and a pastor came every three weeks. The Thirty Years' War (1618 - 1648) reached the village in 1625/26 and brought looting, hunger and plague, so that 80% of the then population died. Zarchlin was completely burnt and reduced to ruins. The chapel was also devastated: the roof was missing and the bells lay smashed on the ground. Because it could no longer be preserved, Zarchlin then became part of the parish of Plauerhagen. From the middle of the 18th century the farming village developed into an estate; the farmers were resettled to the village of Plauerhagen, 3.3 km away. In the second half of the 19th century the estate developed further. It had an area of 480 ha large and developed quite well under the tenants Schumacher and Steinkopf.

In 1945 the estate was expropriated, used by a Soviet military administration and then looted. One year later the Zarchlin estate was divided among 45 new settlers.

Later Zarchlin was merged with the villages of Karow and Plauerhagen to form a large agricultural enterprise, and an agricultural cooperative (LPG) was established.

Today the farmland is privately operated and the manor house is also privately owned. Some buildings from the later development stages of the village are still preserved.

== Climate and geography ==
The average temperature in Zarchlin is about 8° to 9 °C, with average values of about 2 °C in winter and 18 °C in summer. There is about 550 to 600 mm of precipitation per year and the duration of daylight varies between 7 and 17 hours.

The village is located in the Mecklenburg Lake Plateau and lies south of the river Mildenitz. In the northeast, south and northwest there are small forest areas, otherwise there are arable land and pastures around the village.

Zarchlin is 68 meters above sea level. The surroundings of Zarchlin are formed by a ground moraine of the Vistula Ice Age (ca. 75000 - 10000 B.C.) and the ground is flat to even.

== Infrastructure ==
Zarchlin obtains water from the waterworks of the city Plau am See. There is no central village drainage system: mechanically treated wastewater seeps away or reaches a receiving watercourse via ditches, from where the water is discharged into the Lake in Daschow.

The village has wind power plants located south of Zarchlin. The electric current from these is transmitted to Plau am See and comes back to Zarchlin from the transformer station there.

Zarchlin is connected to the natural gas supply of Hansegas.

== Manor house ==
Around 1935, the manor house in the west of the village included a complex of several buildings and other objects. Of these, only the manor house and the foal stable are preserved today as renovated private homes. The complex also included a horse stable, two barns, a sheepfold, a cattle shed, a pigsty, a granary, a farmhouse, a henhouse, a well and two ponds. In the German Democratic Republic (GDR), the manor house served as the town hall, the office of the LPG of Zarchlin, a kindergarten and a consumer shop (Konsum).

Today the restored manor house is a listed building and is privately owned. It includes a small park, which is located south of the house.

On the green area in front of the manor house there is a monument built of boundary stones, with the inscription "Allein sind wir nichts, vereint sind wir alles" ("Alone we are nothing, united we are everything"). The monument refers to the collectivisation of agriculture in the middle of the 20th century.

== Railway station ==
Zarchlin has a single-track railway station about 1.5 km north of the village. It has been out of service for about 20 years. It gives its name to "Bahnhofsstraße" (Station Street), which is one of the two streets of the village. The more historical part of the village, however, is located along the Dorfstraße.
