= Wendisch Waren =

- Ortsteil of Goldberg
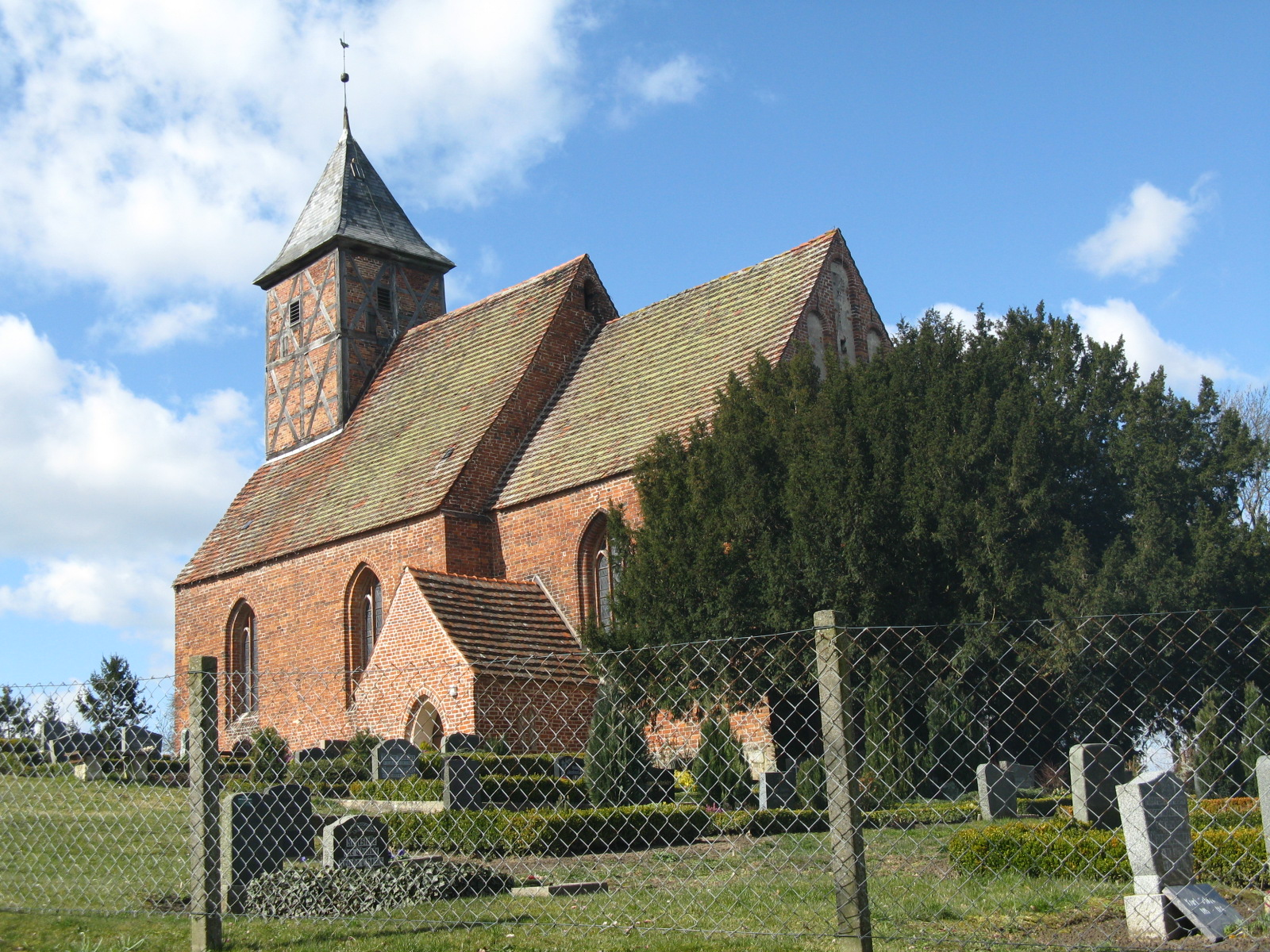
- Church
- Interactive map of Wendisch Waren
- Location within Germany Location within Mecklenburg-Vorpommern
- Coordinates: 53°34′N 12°08′E
- Country: Germany
- State: Mecklenburg-Vorpommern
- District: Ludwigslust-Parchim
- Town: Goldberg
- Subdivisions: 5

Area
  - Total: 14.03 km^{2} (5.42 sq mi)
- Elevation: 51 m (167 ft)

Population (2011-12-31)
  - Total: 362
  - Density: 25.8/km^{2} (66.8/sq mi)
- Time zone: UTC+01:00 (CET)
  - Summer (DST): UTC+02:00 (CEST)
- Postal codes: 19399
- Dialling codes: 038736
- Vehicle registration: PCH
- Website: http://www.amt-mildenitz.de/

Wendisch Waren is a village and a former municipality in the Ludwigslust-Parchim district, in Mecklenburg-Vorpommern, Germany. Since 1 January 2012, it is part of the town Goldberg.
