= Bülow, Germany =

Bülow
- Municipality
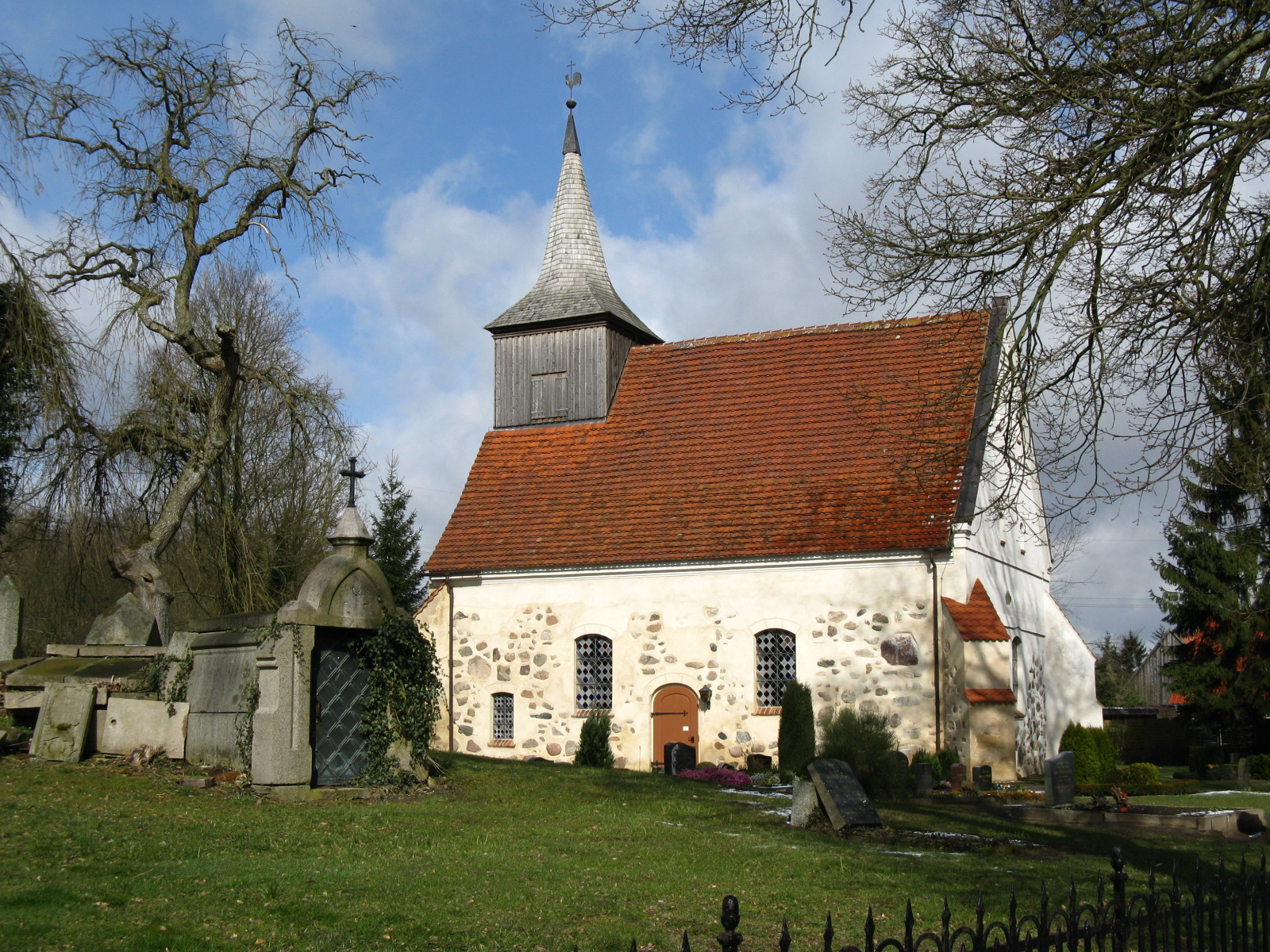
- Church

- Location of Bülow within Ludwigslust-Parchim district
- Interactive map of Bülow
- Location within Germany Location within Mecklenburg-Vorpommern
- Coordinates: 53°35′N 11°46′E
- Country: Germany
- State: Mecklenburg-Vorpommern
- District: Ludwigslust-Parchim
- Municipal assoc.: Crivitz
- Subdivisions: 3

Government
  - Mayor: Klaus Aurich

Area
  - Total: 23.85 km^{2} (9.21 sq mi)
- Elevation: 49 m (161 ft)

Population (2025-12-31)
  - Total: 328
  - Density: 13.8/km^{2} (35.6/sq mi)
- Time zone: UTC+01:00 (CET)
  - Summer (DST): UTC+02:00 (CEST)
- Postal codes: 19089
- Dialling codes: 038723, 038488
- Vehicle registration: PCH
- Website: www.amt-crivitz.de/

Bülow (German pronunciation: [ˈbyːloː]) is a municipality in the Ludwigslust-Parchim district, in Mecklenburg-Vorpommern, Germany.
