= Friedrichsruhe =

- Municipality
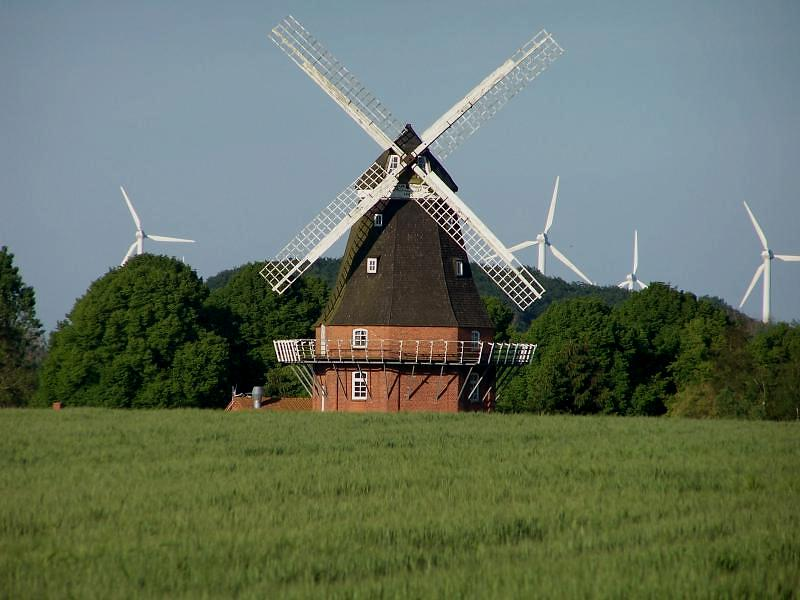
- Windmills

- Location of Friedrichsruhe within Ludwigslust-Parchim district
- Interactive map of Friedrichsruhe
- Location within Germany Location within Mecklenburg-Vorpommern
- Coordinates: 53°32′N 11°46′E
- Country: Germany
- State: Mecklenburg-Vorpommern
- District: Ludwigslust-Parchim
- Municipal assoc.: Crivitz
- Subdivisions: 6

Government
  - Mayor: Wolfgang Reichow

Area
  - Total: 34.66 km^{2} (13.38 sq mi)
- Elevation: 49 m (161 ft)

Population (2025-12-31)
  - Total: 879
  - Density: 25.4/km^{2} (65.7/sq mi)
- Time zone: UTC+01:00 (CET)
  - Summer (DST): UTC+02:00 (CEST)
- Postal codes: 19374
- Dialling codes: 038723
- Vehicle registration: PCH
- Website: http://www.amt-crivitz.de/

Friedrichsruhe is a municipality in the Ludwigslust-Parchim district, in Mecklenburg-Vorpommern, Germany.
