= Tramm, Mecklenburg-Vorpommern =

Tramm
- Municipality
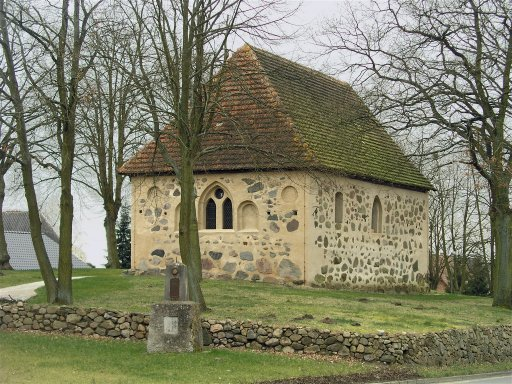
- Church

- Location of Tramm within Ludwigslust-Parchim district
- Interactive map of Tramm
- Location within Germany Location within Mecklenburg-Vorpommern
- Coordinates: 53°31′N 11°38′E
- Country: Germany
- State: Mecklenburg-Vorpommern
- District: Ludwigslust-Parchim
- Municipal assoc.: Crivitz

Government
  - Mayor: Manfred von Walsleben

Area
  - Total: 42.12 km^{2} (16.26 sq mi)
- Elevation: 45 m (148 ft)

Population (2025-12-31)
  - Total: 830
  - Density: 20/km^{2} (51/sq mi)
- Time zone: UTC+01:00 (CET)
  - Summer (DST): UTC+02:00 (CEST)
- Postal codes: 19089
- Dialling codes: 038722
- Vehicle registration: PCH
- Website: http://www.amt-crivitz.de/

Tramm (German pronunciation: [tʁam]) is a municipality in the Ludwigslust-Parchim district, in Mecklenburg-Vorpommern, Germany.
