= Crivitz (Amt) =

- Amt
- Map of Ludwigslust-Parchim highlighting Crivitz
- Interactive map of Crivitz
- Location within Germany Location within Mecklenburg-Vorpommern
- Coordinates: 53°35′N 11°39′E
- Country: Germany
- State: Mecklenburg-Vorpommern
- District: Ludwigslust-Parchim
- Seat: Crivitz
- Subdivisions: 17 municipalities

Area
  - Total: 484.53 km^{2} (187.08 sq mi)

Population (2025-12-31)
  - Total: 24,500
  - Density: 50.6/km^{2} (131/sq mi)
- Time zone: UTC+01:00 (CET)
  - Summer (DST): UTC+02:00 (CEST)
- Website: www.amt-crivitz.de

Crivitz is an Amt in the Ludwigslust-Parchim district, in Mecklenburg-Vorpommern, Germany. The seat of the Amt is in Crivitz. It was established in 2014 by the merger of the former Ämter Crivitz, Banzkow and Ostufer Schweriner See.

== Municipalities ==
The Amt Crivitz consists of the following municipalities:

1. Banzkow
2. Barnin
3. Bülow
4. Cambs
5. Crivitz
6. Demen
7. Dobin am See
8. Friedrichsruhe
9. Gneven
10. Langen Brütz
11. Leezen
12. Pinnow
13. Plate
14. Raben Steinfeld
15. Sukow
16. Tramm
17. Zapel
