= Plau am See (Amt) =

Amt in Mecklenburg-Vorpommern, Germany

- Amt
- Map of Ludwigslust-Parchim highlighting Plau am See
- Interactive map of Plau am See
- Location within Germany Location within Mecklenburg-Vorpommern
- Coordinates: 53°27′N 12°16′E
- Country: Germany
- State: Mecklenburg-Vorpommern
- District: Ludwigslust-Parchim
- Seat: Plau am See
- Subdivisions: 3 municipalities

Area
  - Total: 234.6 km^{2} (90.6 sq mi)

Population (2025-12-31)
  - Total: 7,874
  - Density: 33.56/km^{2} (86.93/sq mi)
- Time zone: UTC+01:00 (CET)
  - Summer (DST): UTC+02:00 (CEST)
- Website: www.amtplau.de

Plau am See (German: [plaʊ̯ am ˈzeː]) is an Amt in the Ludwigslust-Parchim district, in Mecklenburg-Vorpommern, Germany. The seat of the Amt is in Plau am See.

The Amt Plau am See consists of the following municipalities:

1. Barkhagen
2. Ganzlin
3. Plau am See
