= Barkhagen =

- Municipality
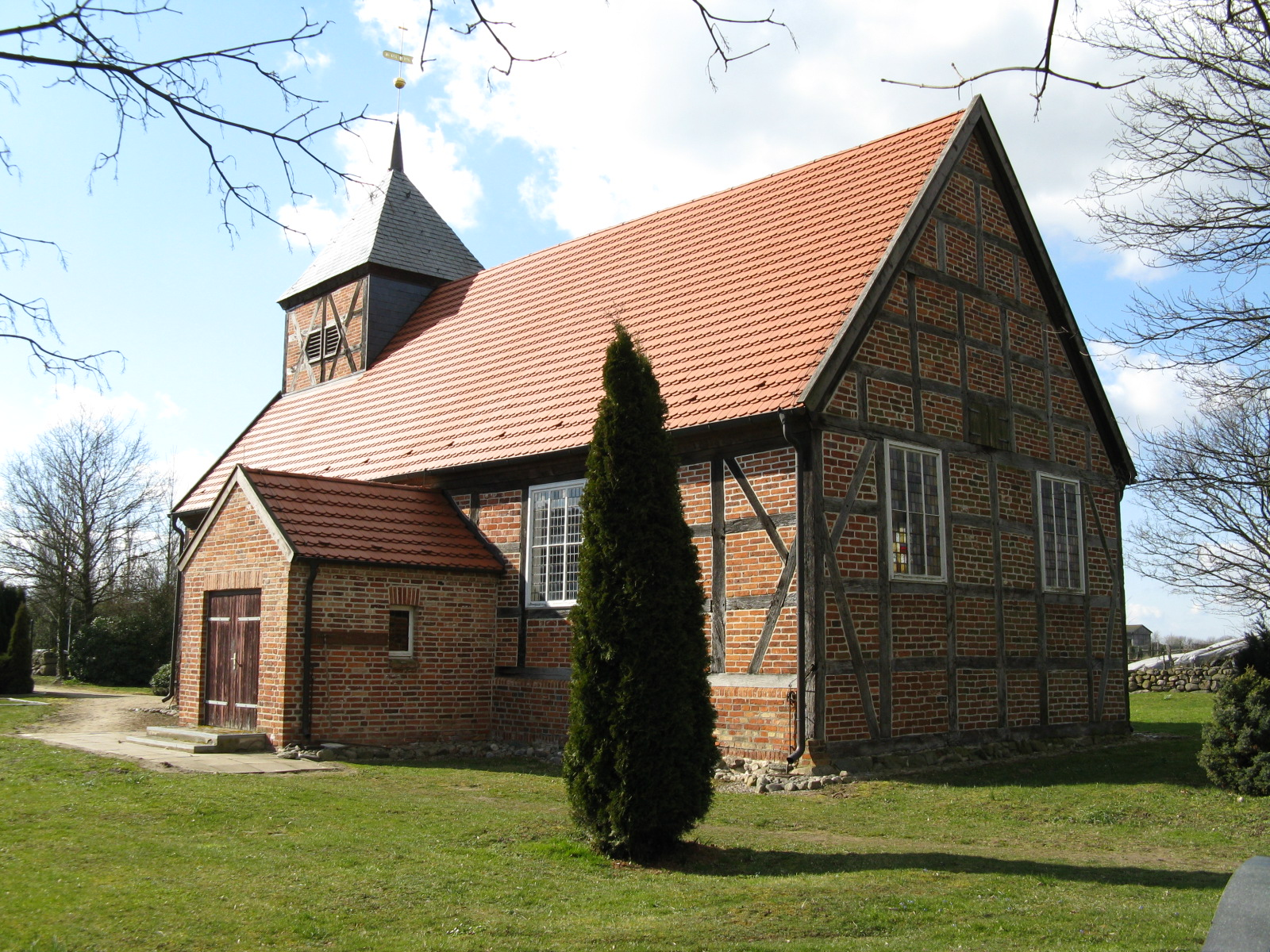
- Church

- Location of Barkhagen within Ludwigslust-Parchim district
- Interactive map of Barkhagen
- Location within Germany Location within Mecklenburg-Vorpommern
- Coordinates: 53°29′N 12°12′E
- Country: Germany
- State: Mecklenburg-Vorpommern
- District: Ludwigslust-Parchim
- Municipal assoc.: Plau am See
- Subdivisions: 5

Government
  - Mayor: Fred Hamann

Area
  - Total: 30.28 km^{2} (11.69 sq mi)
- Elevation: 65 m (213 ft)

Population (2025-12-31)
  - Total: 560
  - Density: 18/km^{2} (48/sq mi)
- Time zone: UTC+01:00 (CET)
  - Summer (DST): UTC+02:00 (CEST)
- Postal codes: 19395
- Dialling codes: 038735
- Vehicle registration: PCH
- Website: www.amtplau.de

Barkhagen is a municipality in the Ludwigslust-Parchim district, in Mecklenburg-Vorpommern, Germany.

It includes the districts of Altenlinden, Barkow (Barkhagen), Kolonie Lalchow, Plauerhagen, Zarchlin and Lage.
