= Barnin =

- Municipality
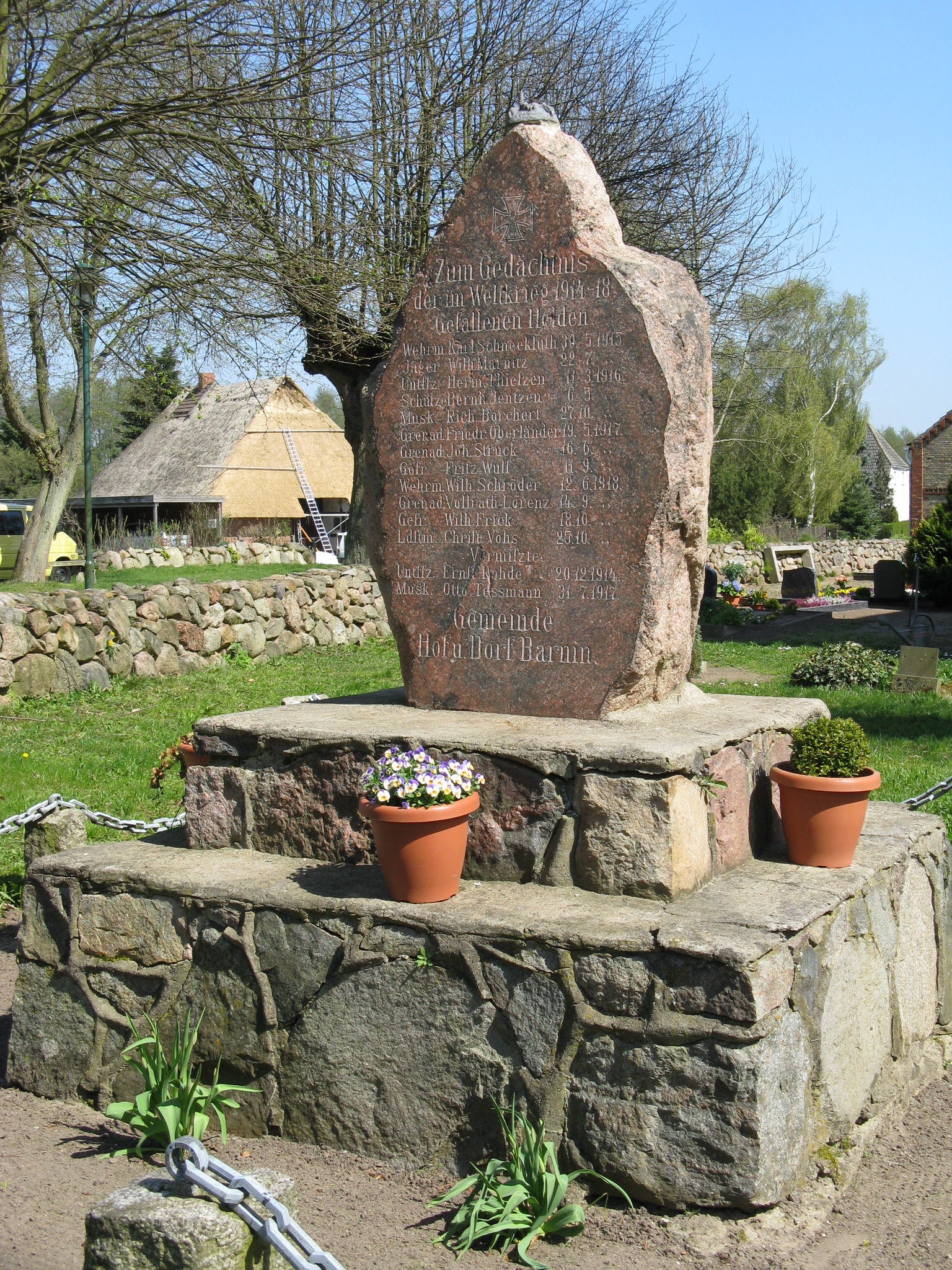
- War memorial in Barnin

- Coat of arms

- Location of Barnin within Ludwigslust-Parchim district
- Interactive map of Barnin
- Location within Germany Location within Mecklenburg-Vorpommern
- Coordinates: 53°36′N 11°42′E
- Country: Germany
- State: Mecklenburg-Vorpommern
- District: Ludwigslust-Parchim
- Municipal assoc.: Crivitz
- Subdivisions: 2

Government
  - Mayor: Siegfried Zimmermann

Area
  - Total: 16.96 km^{2} (6.55 sq mi)
- Elevation: 37 m (121 ft)

Population (2025-12-31)
  - Total: 465
  - Density: 27.4/km^{2} (71.0/sq mi)
- Time zone: UTC+01:00 (CET)
  - Summer (DST): UTC+02:00 (CEST)
- Postal codes: 19089
- Dialling codes: 03863
- Vehicle registration: PCH

Barnin is a municipality in the Ludwigslust-Parchim district, in Mecklenburg-Vorpommern, Germany.
