= Cambs, Germany =

Cambs
- Municipality
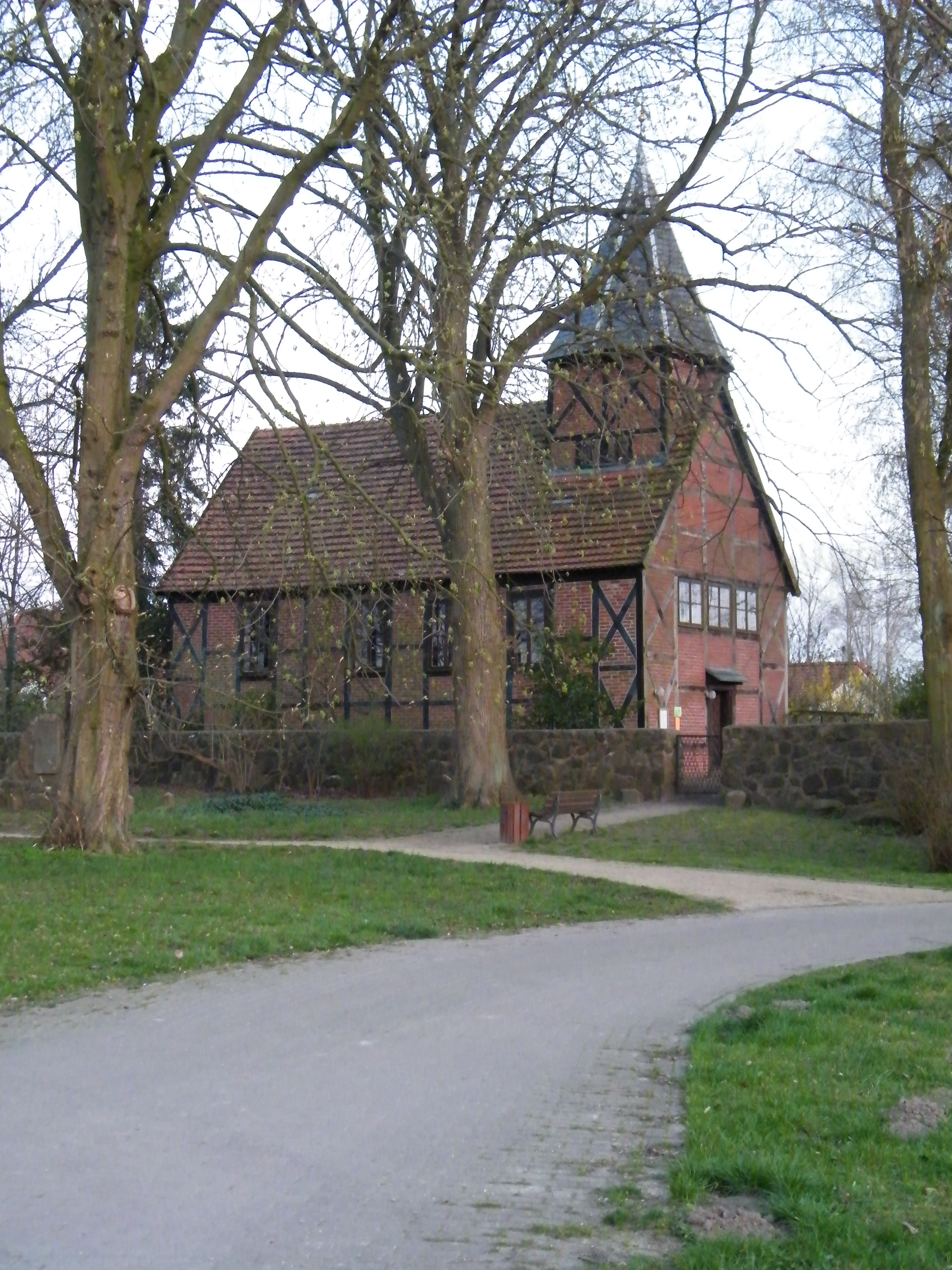
- Village church in Cambs

- Coat of arms

- Location of Cambs within Ludwigslust-Parchim district
- Interactive map of Cambs
- Location within Germany Location within Mecklenburg-Vorpommern
- Coordinates: 53°42′N 11°31′E
- Country: Germany
- State: Mecklenburg-Vorpommern
- District: Ludwigslust-Parchim
- Municipal assoc.: Crivitz
- Subdivisions: 5

Government
  - Mayor: Günter Oepke

Area
  - Total: 20.78 km^{2} (8.02 sq mi)
- Elevation: 32 m (105 ft)

Population (2025-12-31)
  - Total: 620
  - Density: 30/km^{2} (77/sq mi)
- Time zone: UTC+01:00 (CET)
  - Summer (DST): UTC+02:00 (CEST)
- Postal codes: 19067
- Dialling codes: 03866
- Vehicle registration: PCH

Cambs (German pronunciation: [kamps]) is a municipality in the Ludwigslust-Parchim district, in Mecklenburg-Vorpommern, Germany.

== Geography ==
Cambs is located 11 km north east of Schwerin within a large ground moraine area rich of lakes between the Schweriner See and the upper Warnow. There are three lakes on the municipal area: the s shaped 4 kilometres long Cambser See (lake of Cambs), the Weiße See (white lake) and the Schwarze See (black lake).

Beside the name-giving village Cambs there are four more villages within the municipality Cambs: Ahrensboek, Brahlstorf, Karnin and Kleefeld.

== History ==
For several centuries the village of Cambs was an important post station at the postal line Schwerin-Güstrow. Cambs is mentioned documentarily first in 1341.

== Infrastructure ==
=== Fire brigade ===
Like most villages around Schwerin Cambs got an auxiliary fire brigade.

=== Health ===
Cambs has a local medical practice. The nearest hospitals are a specialist rehabilitation hospital in Leezen and the Helios Kliniken, a general hospital in Schwerin.

=== Transportation ===
Cambs is situated close to the newly built parts of the Bundesautobahn 14. The Bundesstraße B 104 goes through Cambs. The parts of this German federal highway close to Cambs are known accident hotspot. For this reason Cambs is a hotspot for traffic supervision by speed cameras as well.

The next train station is located in Schwerin.

Public transport bus service is available. Bus lines connect Cambs with Schwerin, Crivitz, Sternberg, and a lot of smaller villages.

== Local Law ==
The municipality of Cambs taxes second residence and dog ownership.

== Points of interest ==
- church of Cambs built in 1856
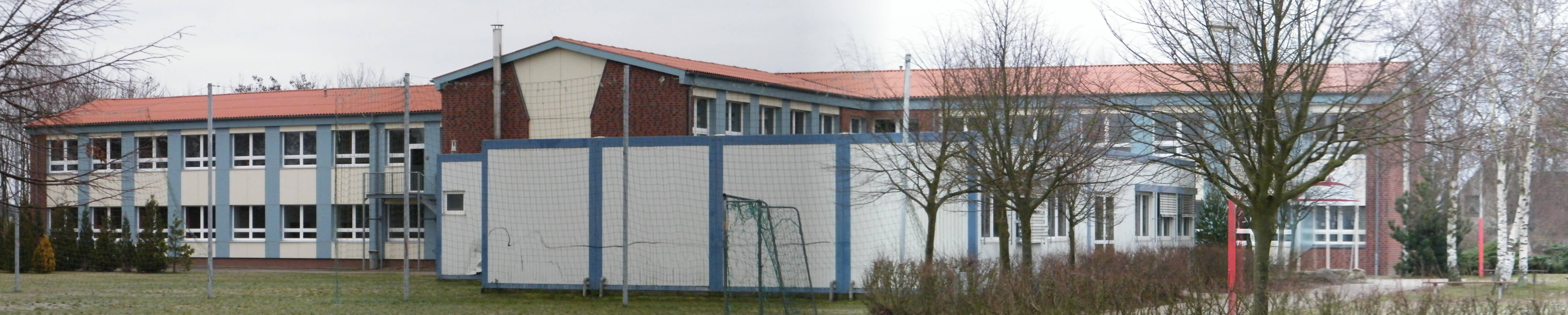
schools of Cambs (Hauptschule and Realschule)

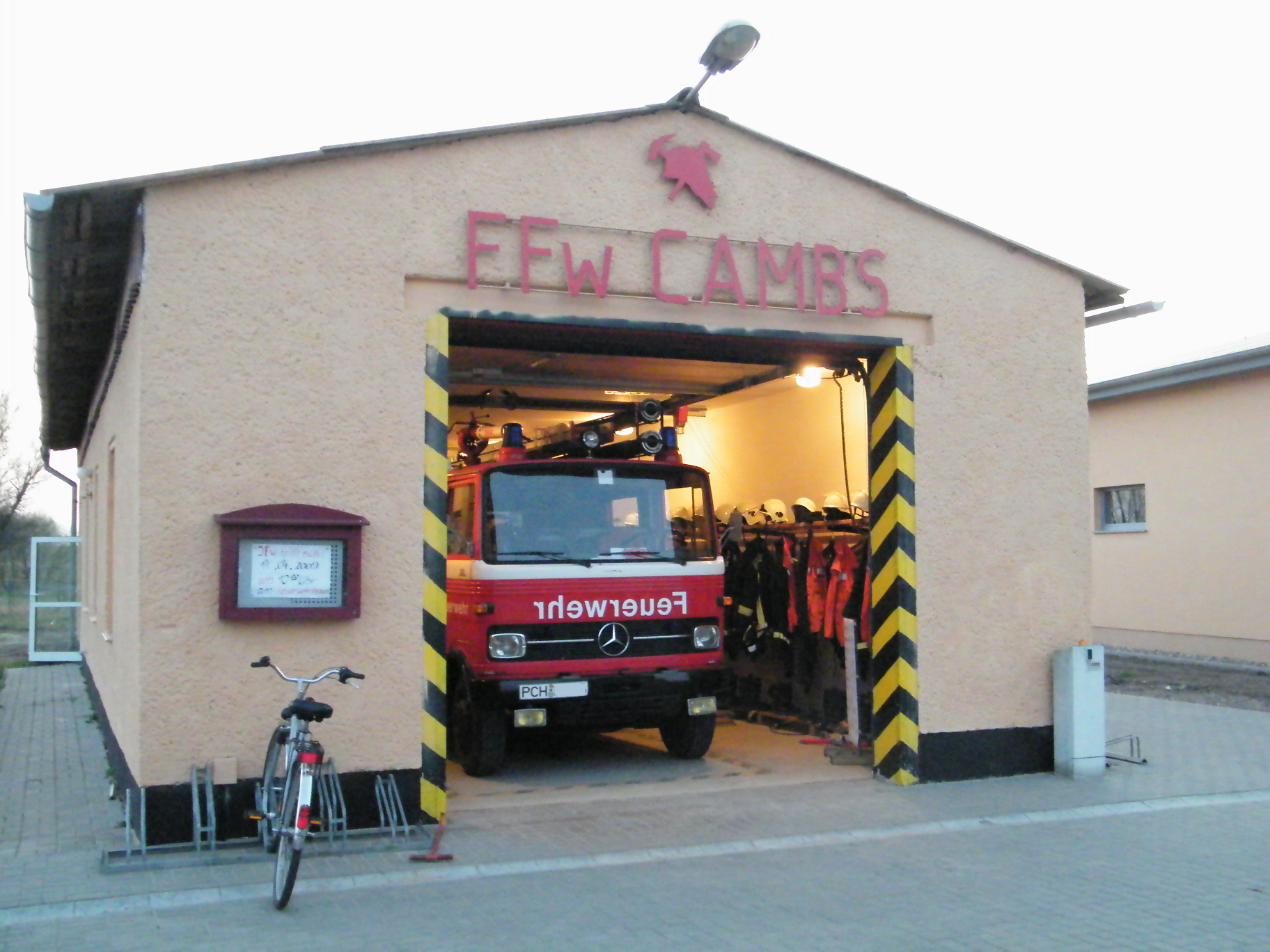
fire station and fire truck of the auxiliary fire brigade of Cambs

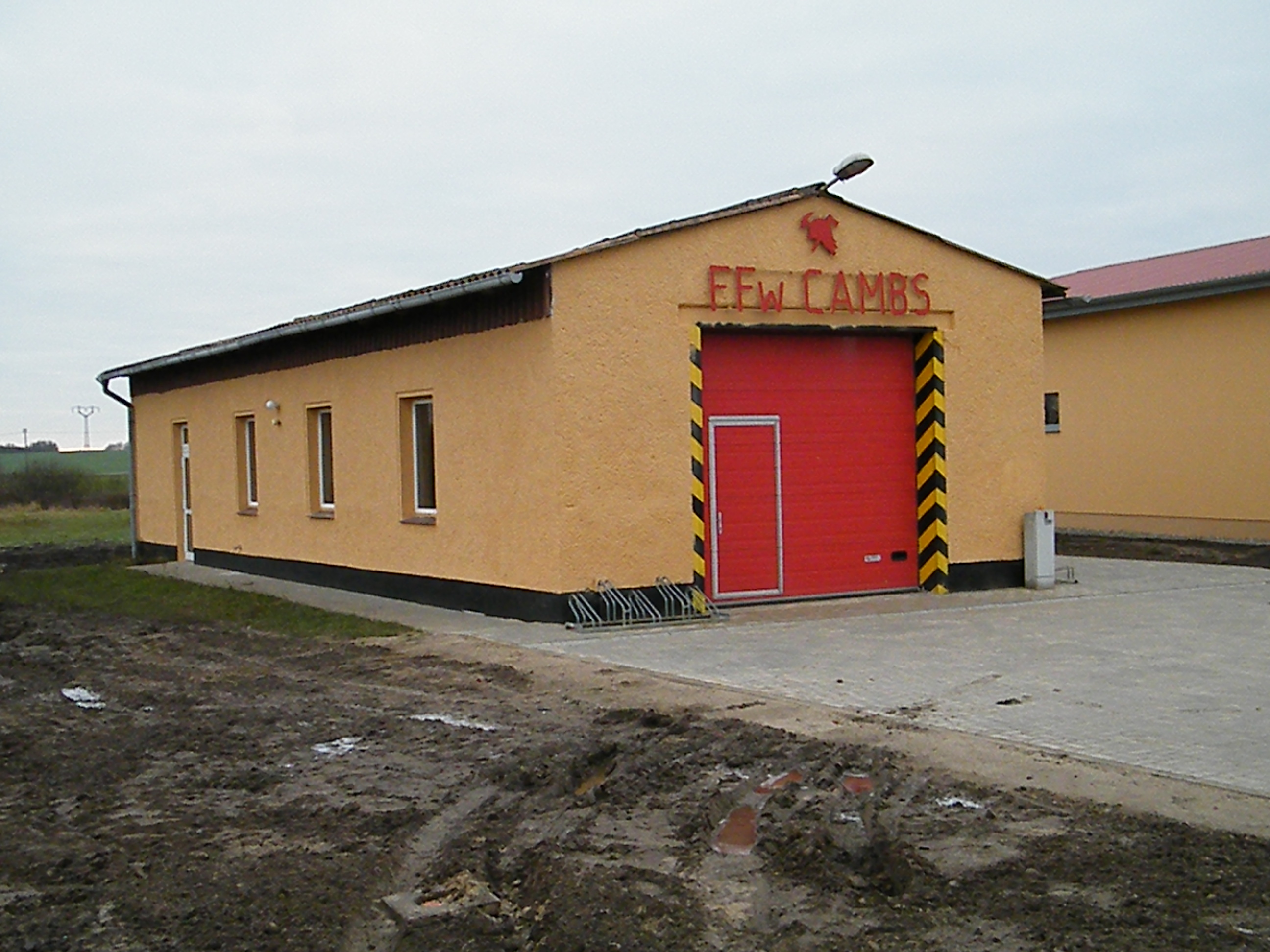
fire station of the auxiliary fire brigade Cambs

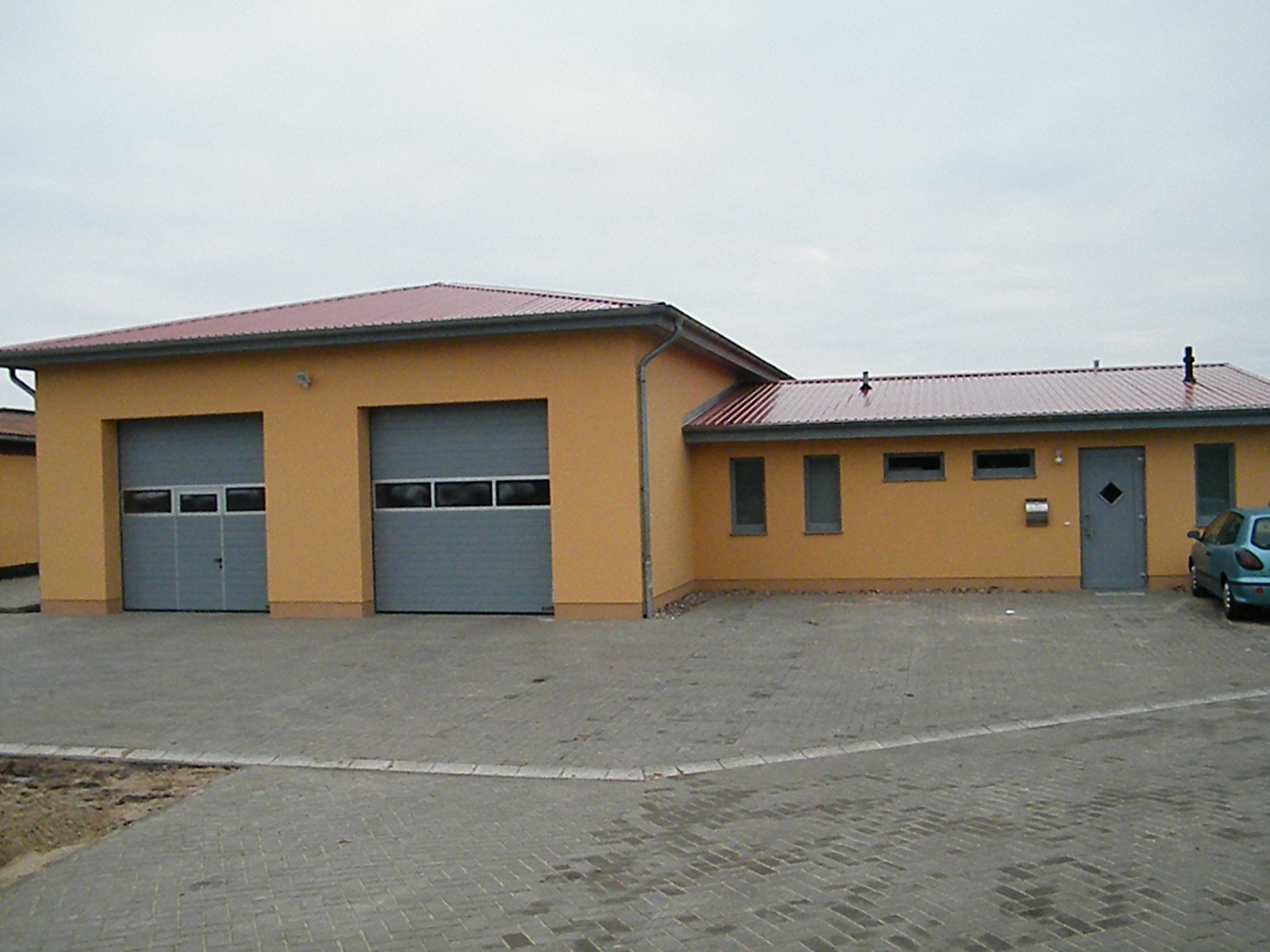
emergency medical services station Cambs

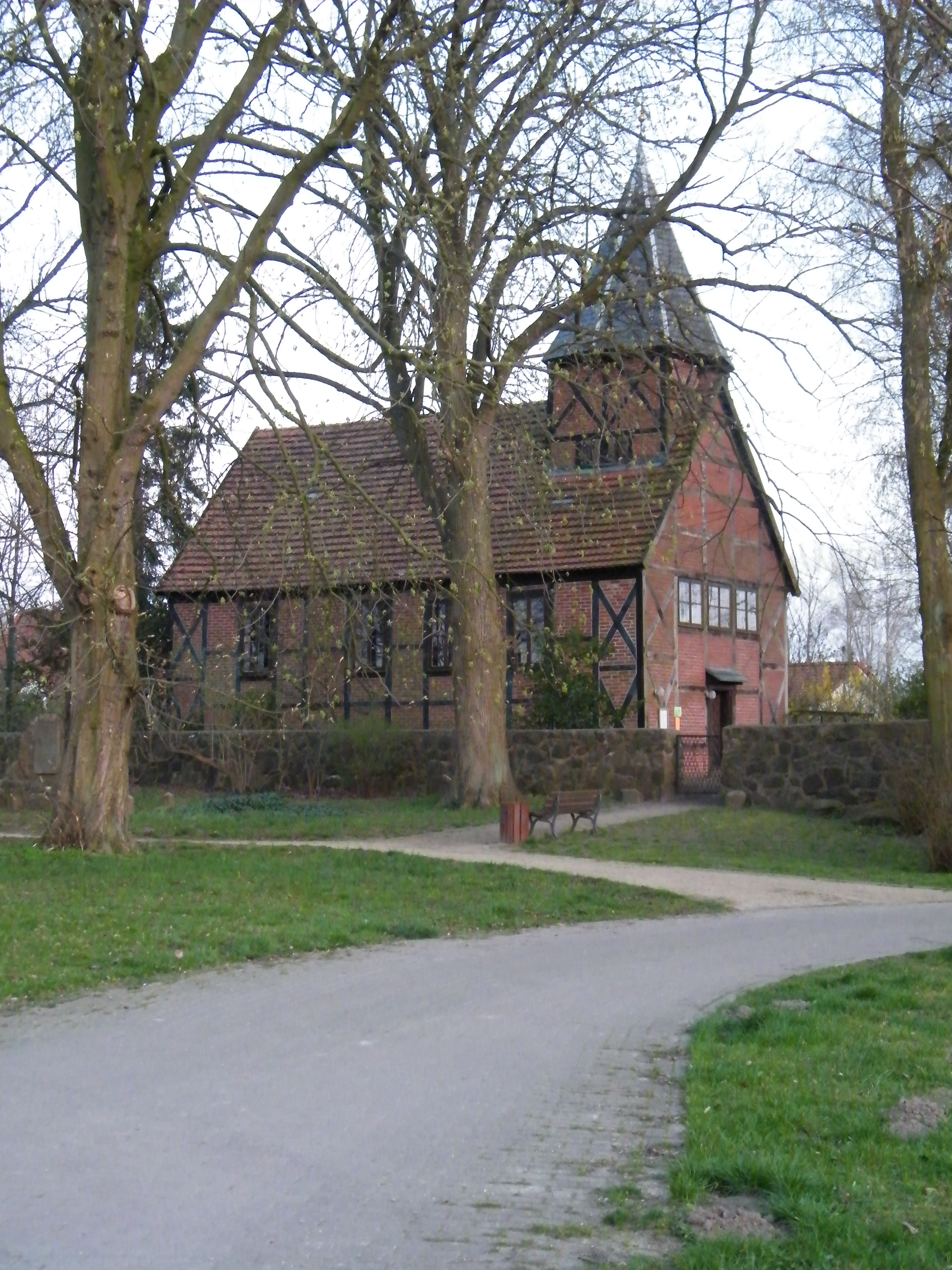
church of Cambs
