= Raben Steinfeld =

- Municipality
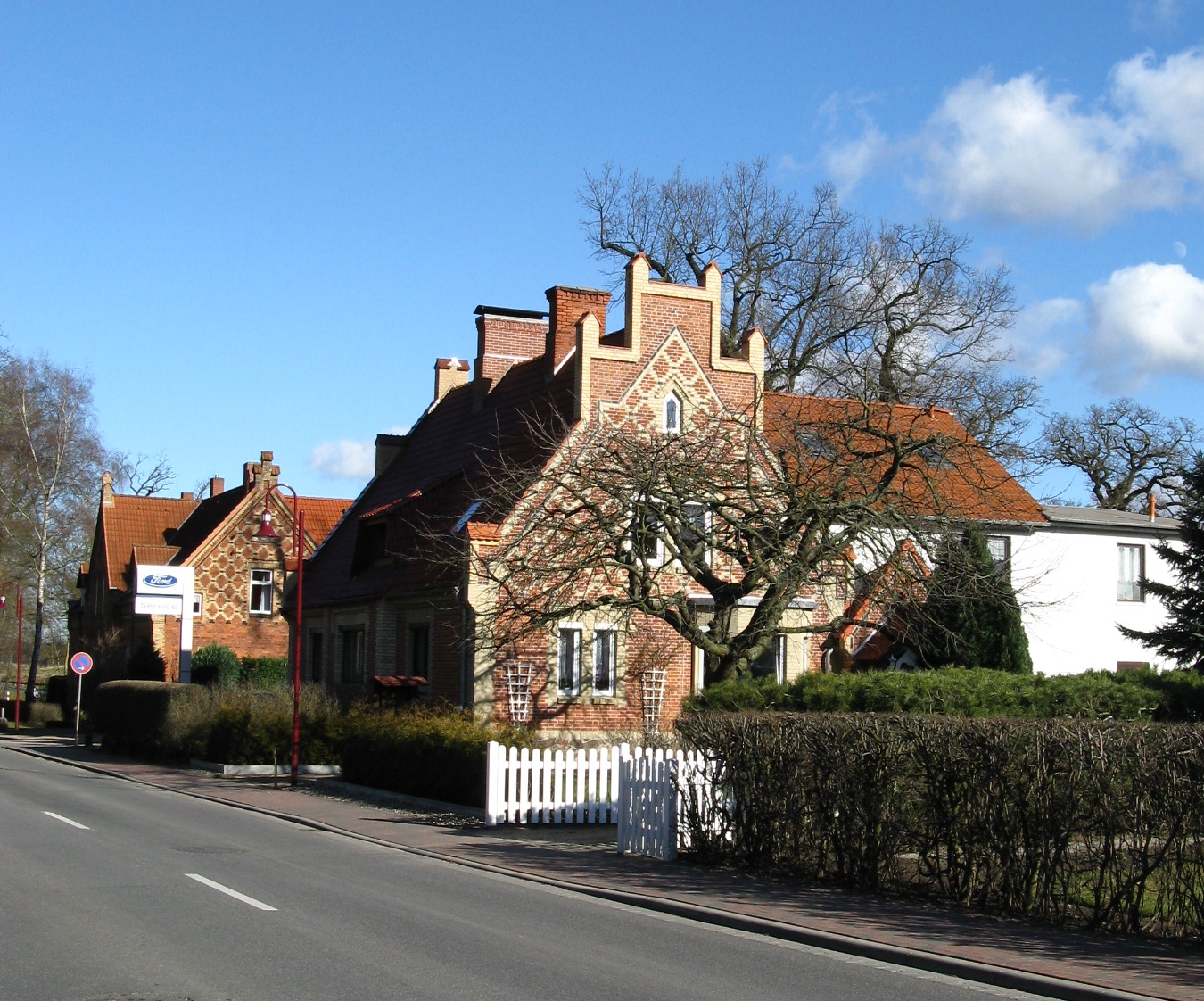
- Raben Steinfeld

- Coat of arms

- Location of Raben Steinfeld within Ludwigslust-Parchim district
- Interactive map of Raben Steinfeld
- Location within Germany Location within Mecklenburg-Vorpommern
- Coordinates: 53°36′N 11°30′E
- Country: Germany
- State: Mecklenburg-Vorpommern
- District: Ludwigslust-Parchim
- Municipal assoc.: Crivitz

Government
  - Mayor: Horst-Dieter Kobi

Area
  - Total: 9.60 km^{2} (3.71 sq mi)
- Elevation: 60 m (200 ft)

Population (2025-12-31)
  - Total: 1,016
  - Density: 106/km^{2} (274/sq mi)
- Time zone: UTC+01:00 (CET)
  - Summer (DST): UTC+02:00 (CEST)
- Postal codes: 19065
- Dialling codes: 03860
- Vehicle registration: PCH

Raben Steinfeld is a municipality in the Ludwigslust-Parchim district, in Mecklenburg-Vorpommern, Germany.
