= Sukow =

- Municipality
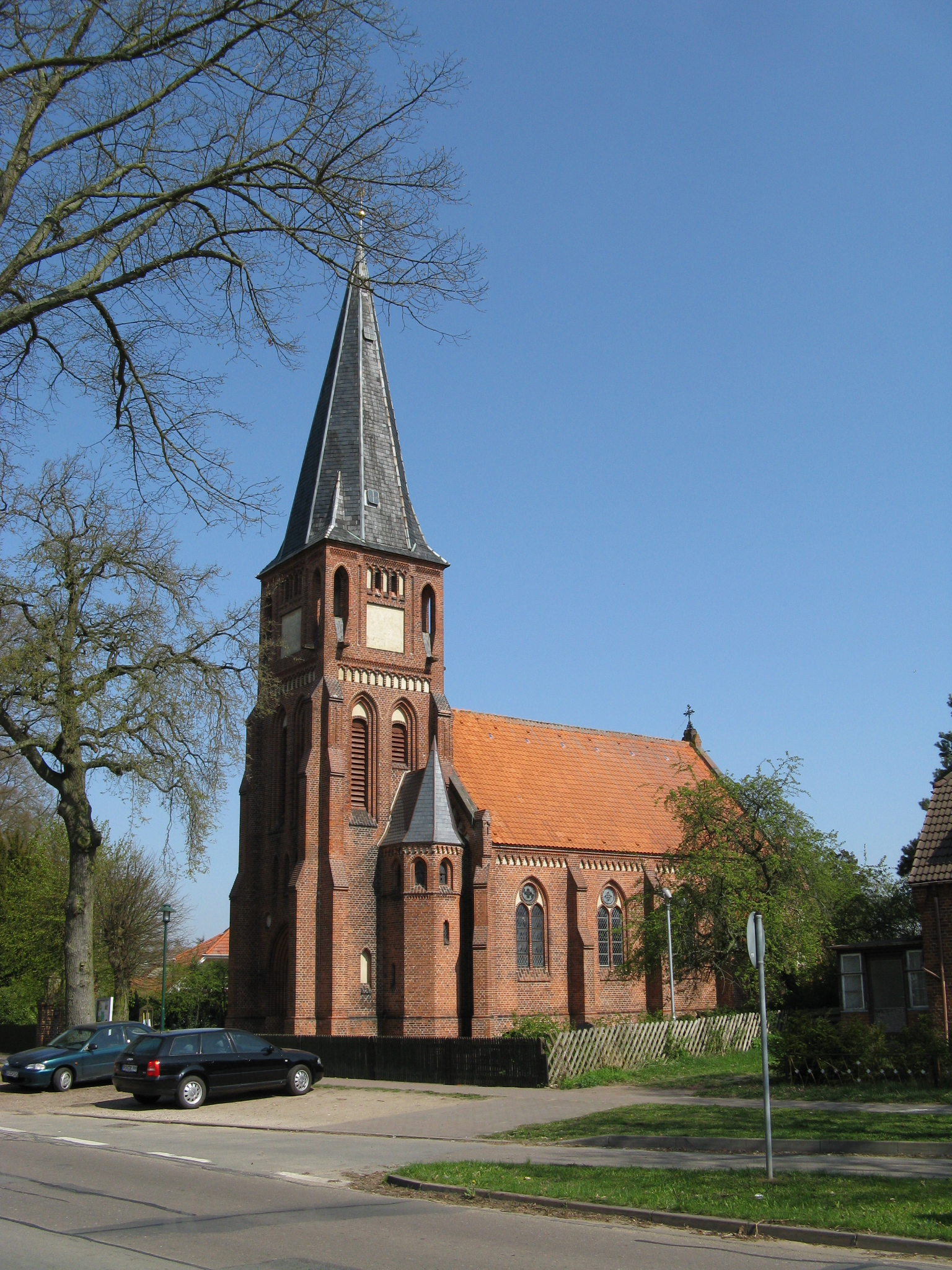
- Church in Sukow

- Location of Sukow within Ludwigslust-Parchim district
- Interactive map of Sukow
- Location within Germany Location within Mecklenburg-Vorpommern
- Coordinates: 53°33′N 11°34′E
- Country: Germany
- State: Mecklenburg-Vorpommern
- District: Ludwigslust-Parchim
- Municipal assoc.: Crivitz
- Subdivisions: 2

Government
  - Mayor: Horst-Dieter Keding

Area
  - Total: 21.36 km^{2} (8.25 sq mi)
- Elevation: 39 m (128 ft)

Population (2025-12-31)
  - Total: 1,498
  - Density: 70.13/km^{2} (181.6/sq mi)
- Time zone: UTC+01:00 (CET)
  - Summer (DST): UTC+02:00 (CEST)
- Postal codes: 19079
- Dialling codes: 03861
- Vehicle registration: PCH
- Website: www.sukow.de

Sukow (German pronunciation: [ˈzuːkoː]) is a municipality in the Ludwigslust-Parchim district, in Mecklenburg-Vorpommern, Germany.
