= Gneven =

- Municipality
- Location of Gneven within Ludwigslust-Parchim district
- Interactive map of Gneven
- Location within Germany Location within Mecklenburg-Vorpommern
- Coordinates: 53°37′N 11°34′E
- Country: Germany
- State: Mecklenburg-Vorpommern
- District: Ludwigslust-Parchim
- Municipal assoc.: Crivitz
- Subdivisions: 2 Ortsteile

Government
  - Mayor: Johannes Neben

Area
  - Total: 10.28 km^{2} (3.97 sq mi)
- Elevation: 30 m (98 ft)

Population (2025-12-31)
  - Total: 339
  - Density: 33.0/km^{2} (85.4/sq mi)
- Time zone: UTC+01:00 (CET)
  - Summer (DST): UTC+02:00 (CEST)
- Postal codes: 19065
- Dialling codes: 03860
- Vehicle registration: PCH

Gneven is a municipality in the Ludwigslust-Parchim district, in Mecklenburg-Vorpommern, Germany. It consists of the Ortsteile Gneven and Vorbeck.
