= Plate, Germany =

Plate
- Municipality
- Coat of arms

- Location of Plate within Ludwigslust-Parchim district
- Interactive map of Plate
- Location within Germany Location within Mecklenburg-Vorpommern
- Coordinates: 53°33′N 11°30′E
- Country: Germany
- State: Mecklenburg-Vorpommern
- District: Ludwigslust-Parchim
- Municipal assoc.: Crivitz
- Subdivisions: 3

Government
  - Mayor: Ronald Radscheidt

Area
  - Total: 22.14 km^{2} (8.55 sq mi)
- Elevation: 38 m (125 ft)

Population (2025-12-31)
  - Total: 3,255
  - Density: 147.0/km^{2} (380.8/sq mi)
- Time zone: UTC+01:00 (CET)
  - Summer (DST): UTC+02:00 (CEST)
- Postal codes: 19086
- Dialling codes: 03861
- Vehicle registration: LUP, PCH
- Website: www.gemeinde-plate.de

Plate (German pronunciation: [ˈplaːtə]) is a municipality in the Ludwigslust-Parchim district, in Mecklenburg-Vorpommern, Germany.

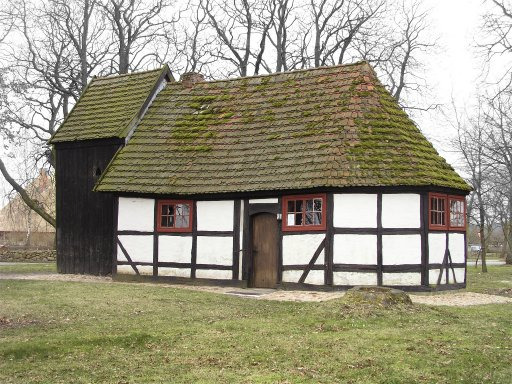
Church

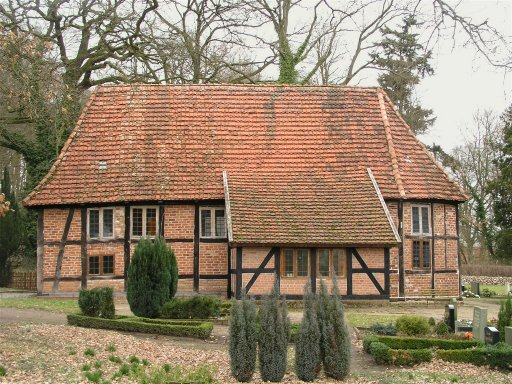
Church

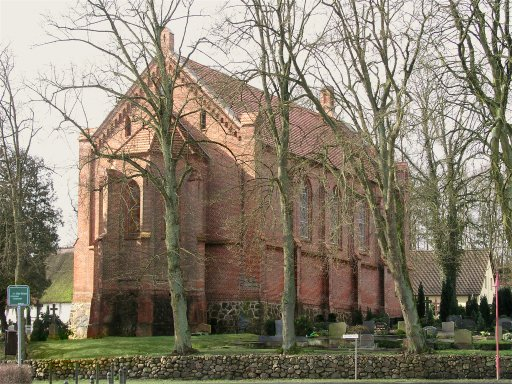
Church

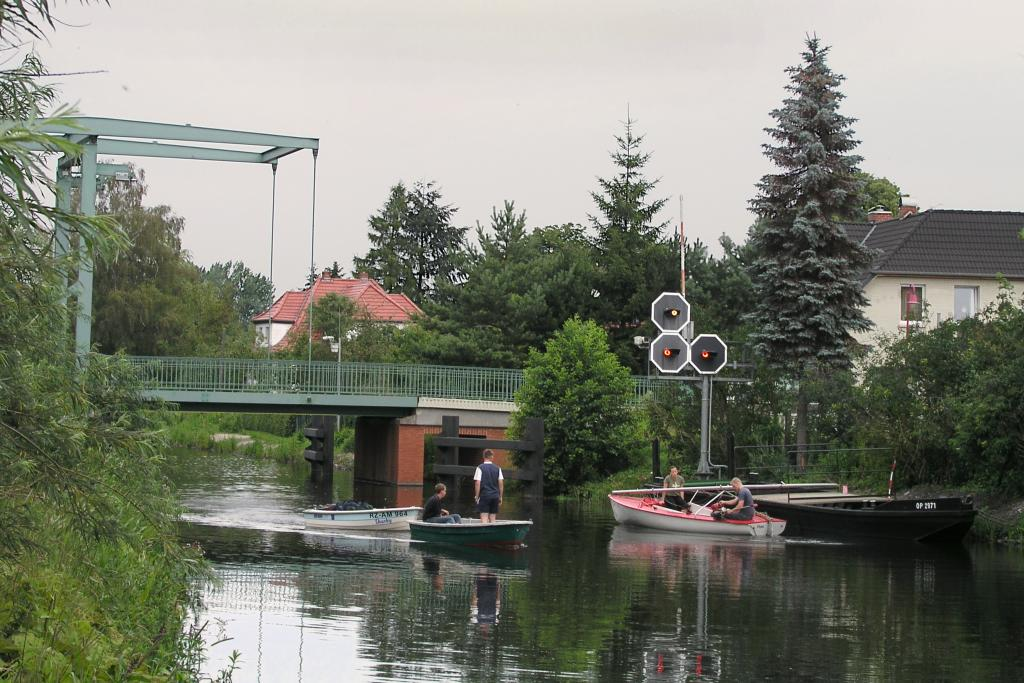
Stör-channel

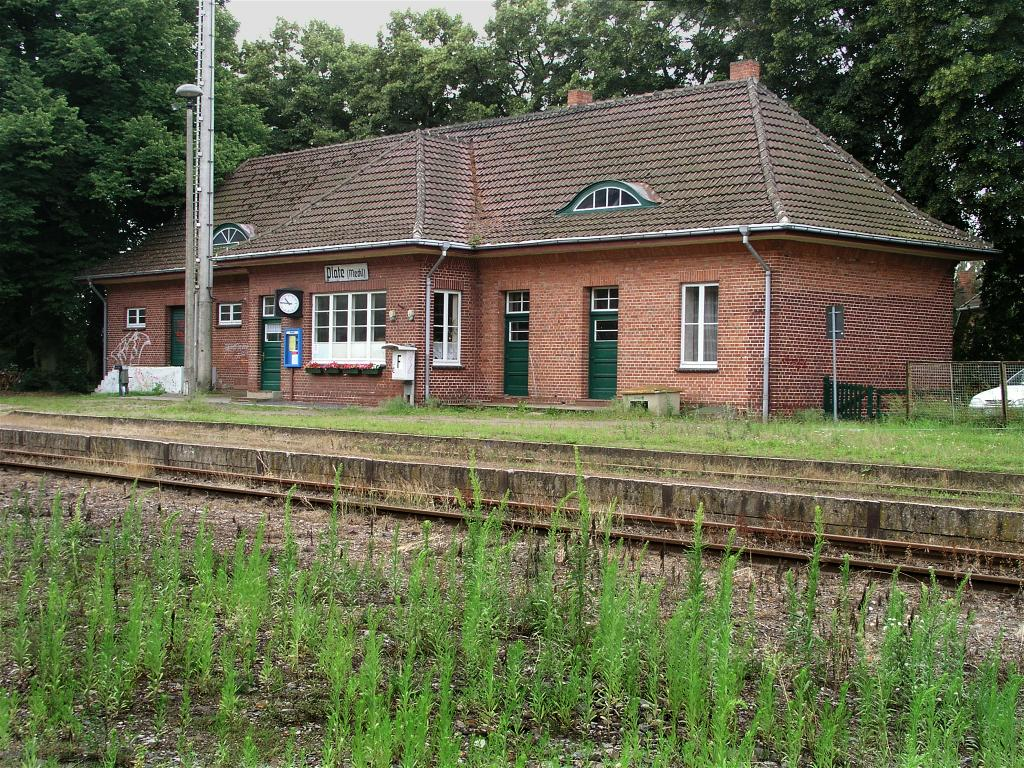
Train station

== See also ==
- List of municipalities in Germany
- Towns in Mecklenburg-Vorpommern
