= Leezen, Mecklenburg-Vorpommern =

Leezen
- Municipality
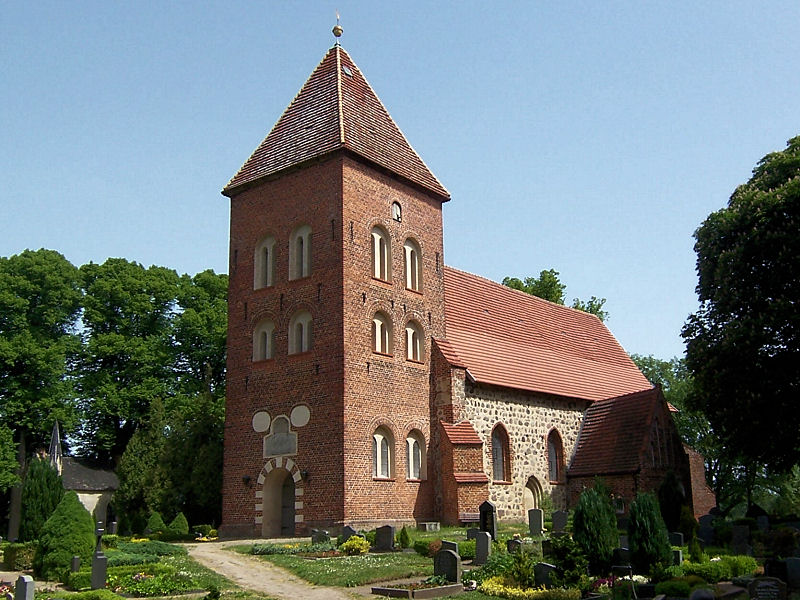
- Church

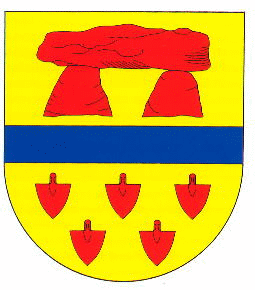
- Coat of arms

- Location of Leezen within Ludwigslust-Parchim district
- Interactive map of Leezen
- Location within Germany Location within Mecklenburg-Vorpommern
- Coordinates: 53°39′N 11°30′E
- Country: Germany
- State: Mecklenburg-Vorpommern
- District: Ludwigslust-Parchim
- Municipal assoc.: Crivitz
- Subdivisions: 5

Government
  - Mayor: Karl-Hermann Wreth

Area
  - Total: 26.53 km^{2} (10.24 sq mi)
- Elevation: 58 m (190 ft)

Population (2025-12-31)
  - Total: 2,055
  - Density: 77.46/km^{2} (200.6/sq mi)
- Time zone: UTC+01:00 (CET)
  - Summer (DST): UTC+02:00 (CEST)
- Postal codes: 19067
- Dialling codes: 03866
- Vehicle registration: PCH

Leezen (German pronunciation: [ˈleːtsn̩]) is a municipality in the Ludwigslust-Parchim district, in Mecklenburg-Vorpommern, Germany.
