= Langen Brütz =

- Municipality
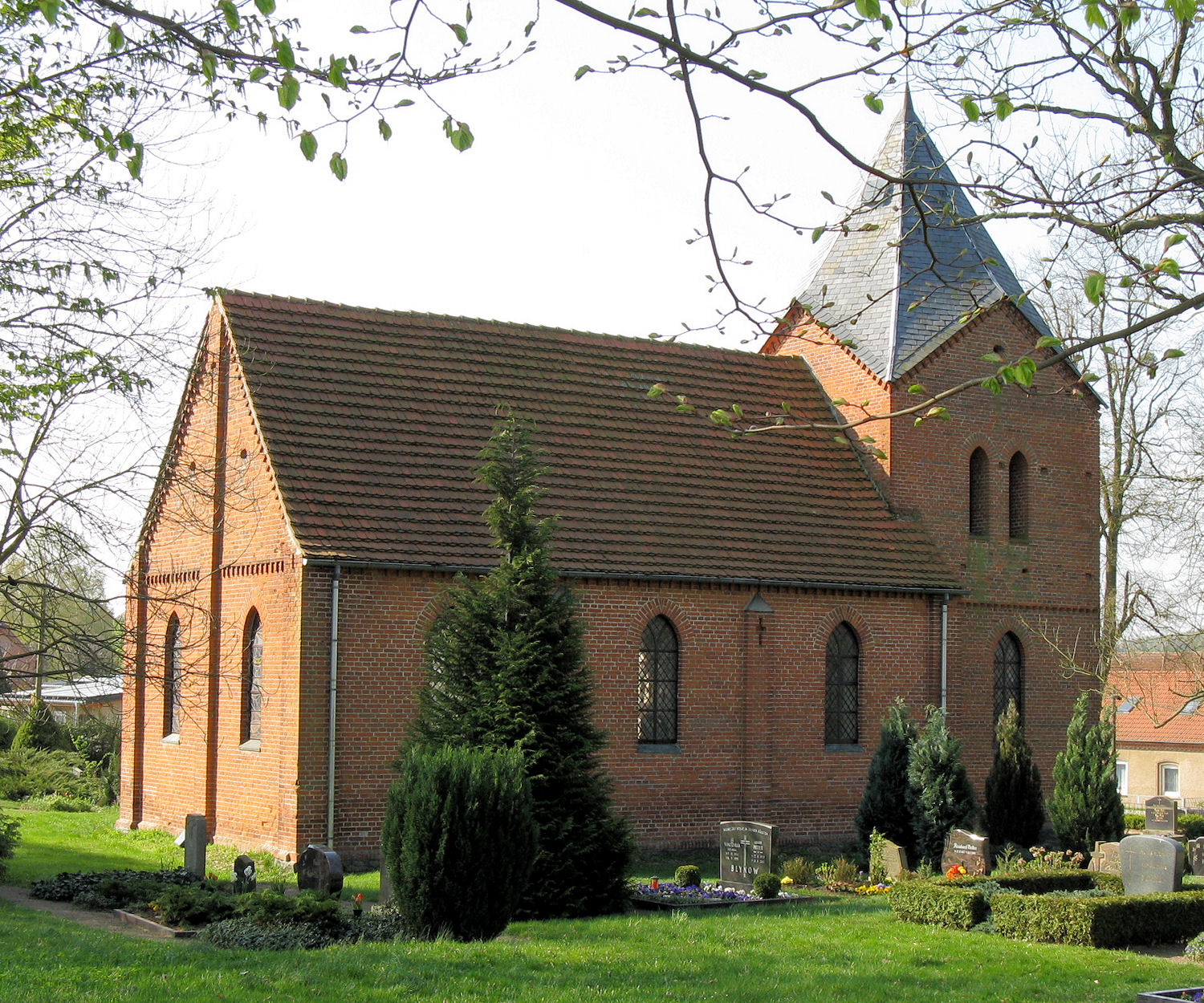
- Church in Langen Brütz

- Location of Langen Brütz within Ludwigslust-Parchim district
- Interactive map of Langen Brütz
- Location within Germany Location within Mecklenburg-Vorpommern
- Coordinates: 53°38′N 11°33′E
- Country: Germany
- State: Mecklenburg-Vorpommern
- District: Ludwigslust-Parchim
- Municipal assoc.: Crivitz
- Subdivisions: 2

Government
  - Mayor: Gunnar Weinke

Area
  - Total: 15.43 km^{2} (5.96 sq mi)
- Elevation: 30 m (98 ft)

Population (2025-12-31)
  - Total: 475
  - Density: 30.8/km^{2} (79.7/sq mi)
- Time zone: UTC+01:00 (CET)
  - Summer (DST): UTC+02:00 (CEST)
- Postal codes: 19067
- Dialling codes: 03866
- Vehicle registration: PCH
- Website: www.langenbruetz.de

Langen Brütz (German pronunciation: [ˈlaŋən ˈbʁʏts]) is a municipality in the Ludwigslust-Parchim district, in Mecklenburg-Vorpommern, Germany.
