= Goldberg, Germany =

Town in Mecklenburg-Vorpommern, Germany

Goldberg
- Town
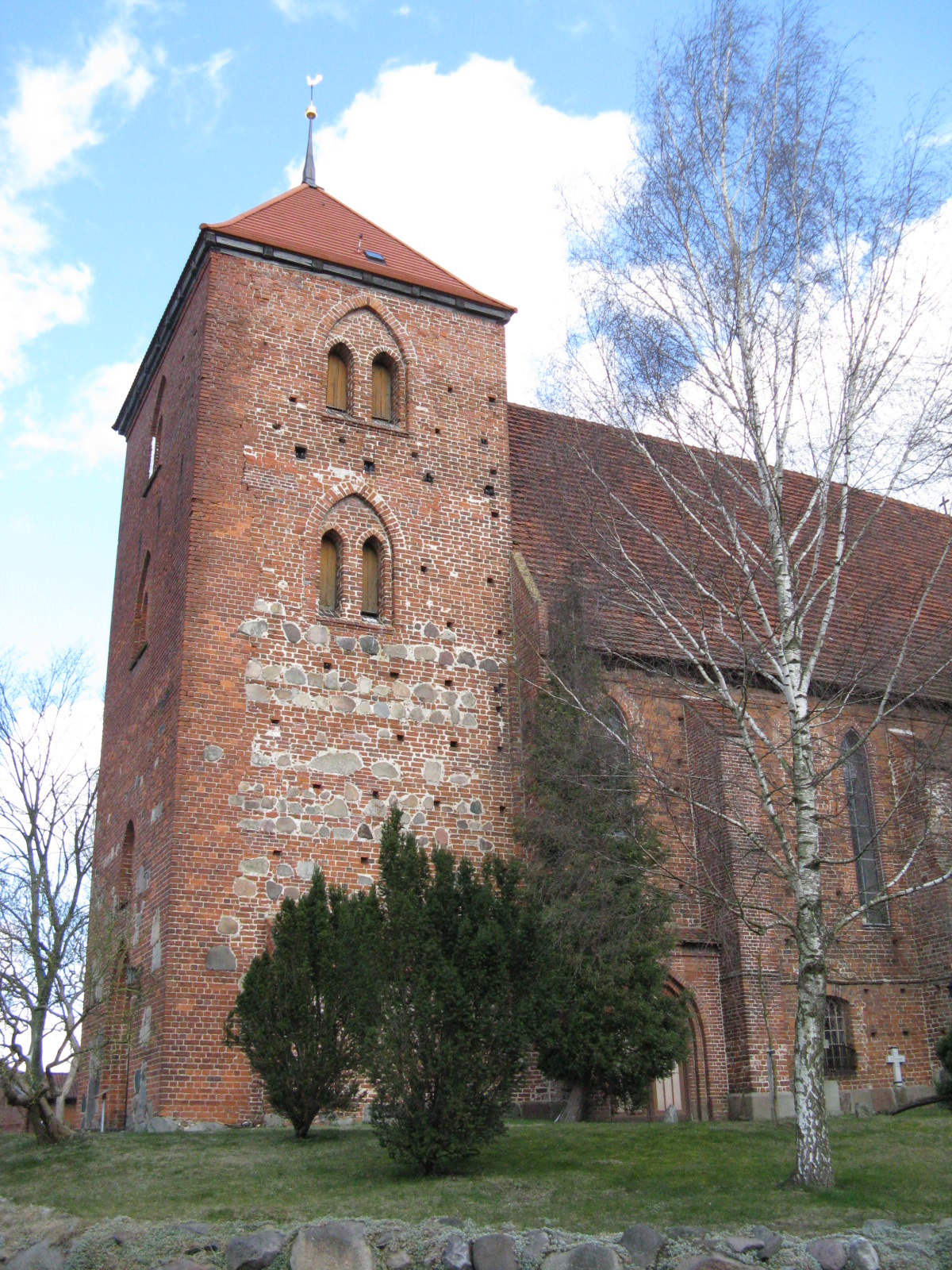
- Church

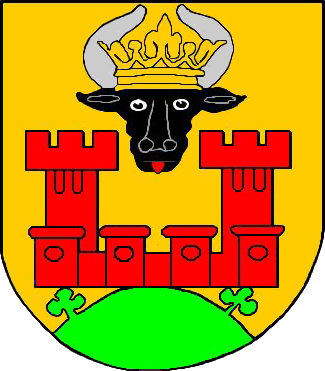
- Coat of arms

- Location of Goldberg within Ludwigslust-Parchim district
- Interactive map of Goldberg
- Location within Germany Location within Mecklenburg-Vorpommern
- Coordinates: 53°34′N 12°04′E
- Country: Germany
- State: Mecklenburg-Vorpommern
- District: Ludwigslust-Parchim
- Municipal assoc.: Goldberg-Mildenitz
- Subdivisions: 8 Ortsteile

Government
  - Mayor: Peer Grützmacher

Area
  - Total: 64.72 km^{2} (24.99 sq mi)
- Elevation: 48 m (157 ft)

Population (2025-12-31)
  - Total: 3,174
  - Density: 49.04/km^{2} (127.0/sq mi)
- Time zone: UTC+01:00 (CET)
  - Summer (DST): UTC+02:00 (CEST)
- Postal codes: 19399
- Dialling codes: 038736
- Vehicle registration: PCH
- Website: www.amt-goldberg-mildenitz.de

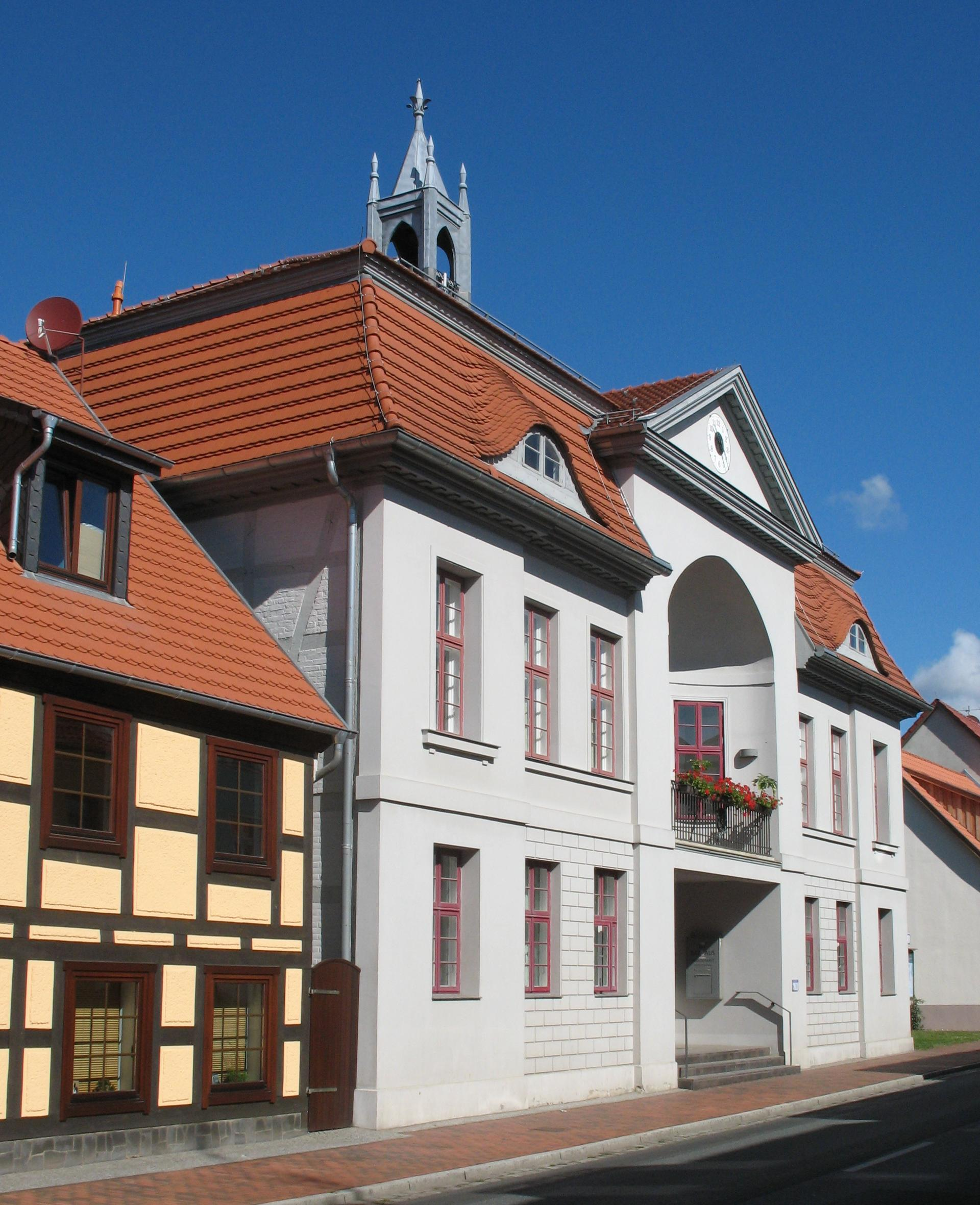
Town hall

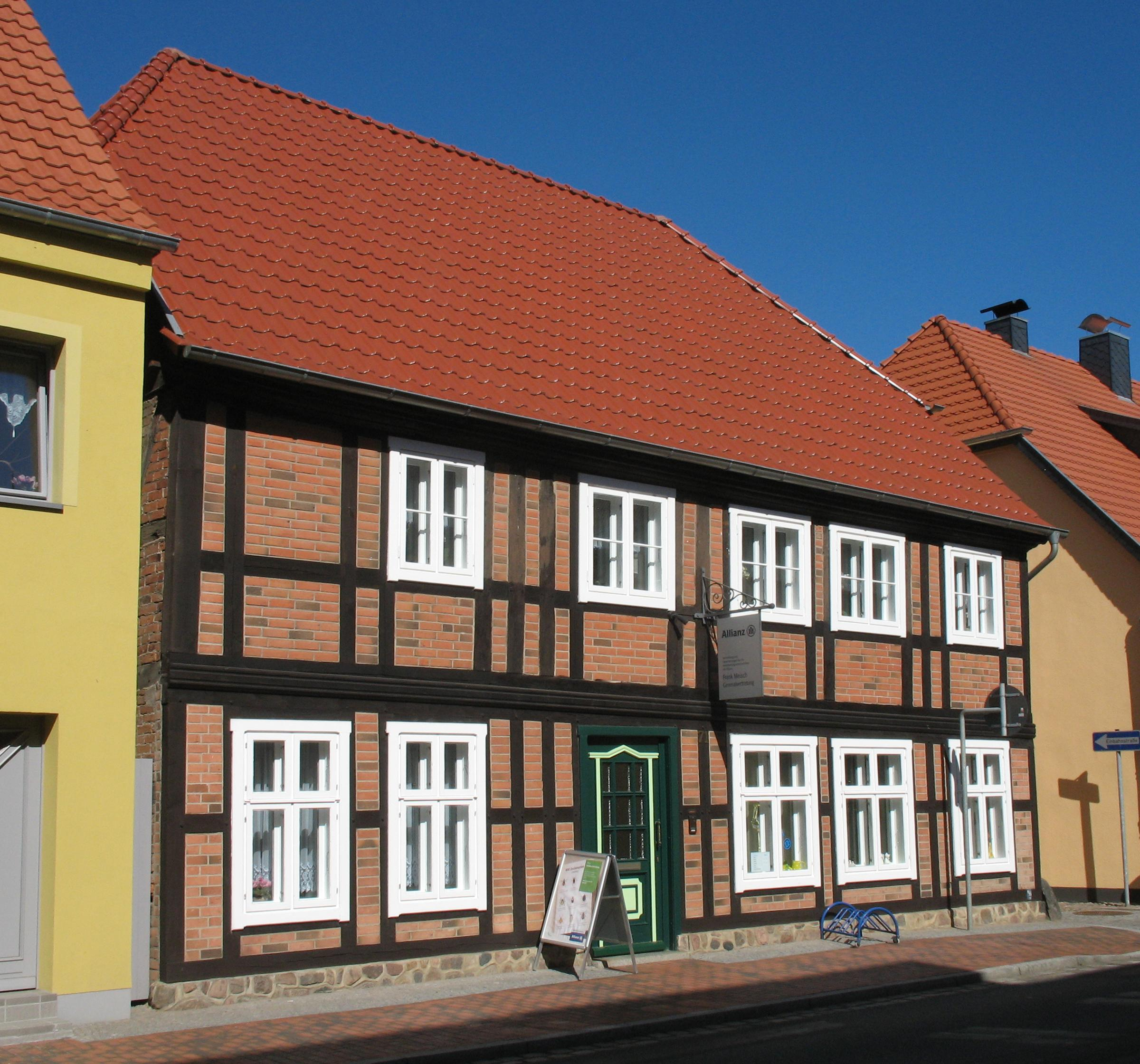
Goldberg

Goldberg (German pronunciation: [ˈɡɔltˌbɛʁk]) is a town in the Ludwigslust-Parchim district, in Mecklenburg-Western Pomerania, Germany. It is situated 24 km northeast of Parchim, and 46 km east of Schwerin.

== History ==
Goldberg owes its origin and name to a gold mine in the neighbourhood, which, however, has been wholly abandoned since the time of the Hussite wars. The town obtained civic rights in 1211. It suffered heavily from the Tatars in 1241, from the plague in 1334, from the Hussites in 1428, and from the Saxon, Imperial and Swedish forces during the Thirty Years' War. During the Napoleonic Wars, on 27 May 1813 a battle took place near it between the French and the Russians; and on the 23rd and 27 August of the same year fights between the allies and the French.

== Climate ==
Climate data for Goldeberg (1991–2020 normals)
| Month | Jan | Feb | Mar | Apr | May | Jun | Jul | Aug | Sep | Oct | Nov | Dec | Year |
|---|---|---|---|---|---|---|---|---|---|---|---|---|---|
| Mean daily maximum °C (°F) | 3.1 (37.6) | 4.7 (40.5) | 8.2 (46.8) | 14.2 (57.6) | 18.3 (64.9) | 21.7 (71.1) | 23.7 (74.7) | 23.6 (74.5) | 19.2 (66.6) | 13.6 (56.5) | 7.8 (46.0) | 4.2 (39.6) | 13.6 (56.5) |
| Daily mean °C (°F) | 0.9 (33.6) | 1.5 (34.7) | 4.2 (39.6) | 9.0 (48.2) | 13.1 (55.6) | 16.4 (61.5) | 18.3 (64.9) | 18.2 (64.8) | 14.4 (57.9) | 9.8 (49.6) | 5.4 (41.7) | 2.4 (36.3) | 9.6 (49.3) |
| Mean daily minimum °C (°F) | −1.7 (28.9) | −0.9 (30.4) | 0.4 (32.7) | 3.8 (38.8) | 7.6 (45.7) | 10.9 (51.6) | 13.2 (55.8) | 13.2 (55.8) | 10.1 (50.2) | 6.5 (43.7) | 2.9 (37.2) | 0.0 (32.0) | 5.6 (42.1) |
| Average precipitation mm (inches) | 53.9 (2.12) | 40.7 (1.60) | 39.2 (1.54) | 28.6 (1.13) | 46.4 (1.83) | 61.6 (2.43) | 75.9 (2.99) | 58.0 (2.28) | 50.2 (1.98) | 47.3 (1.86) | 47.7 (1.88) | 48.1 (1.89) | 593.2 (23.35) |
| Average precipitation days (≥ 1.0 mm) | 18.9 | 14.9 | 13.9 | 10.4 | 13.1 | 13.4 | 15.2 | 15.4 | 13.1 | 14.5 | 16.1 | 18.6 | 174.2 |
| Average relative humidity (%) | 89.5 | 85.5 | 80.2 | 71.1 | 73.2 | 74.3 | 74.8 | 76.5 | 80.3 | 86.0 | 90.4 | 90.2 | 81.0 |
| Mean monthly sunshine hours | 42.0 | 73.3 | 127.3 | 205.4 | 236.4 | 233.5 | 233.1 | 204.1 | 164.7 | 110.6 | 52.1 | 37.7 | 1,769.9 |
Source: World Meteorological Organization

== People born in the town ==
- Peter Larisch (born 1950), GDR handball player

== Connected to Goldberg ==
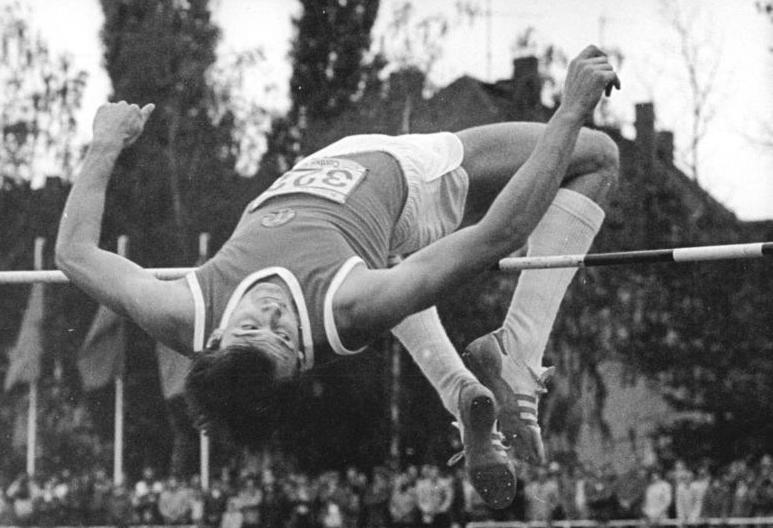
Gerd Wessig in 1980

- Peter Kurth (born 1957), German actor, grew up in the town
- Gerd Wessig (born 1959 in Lübz), GDR Olympian champion and world record holder (2,36 m) in the high jump, grew up in Goldberg and went to school there

== Gallery ==
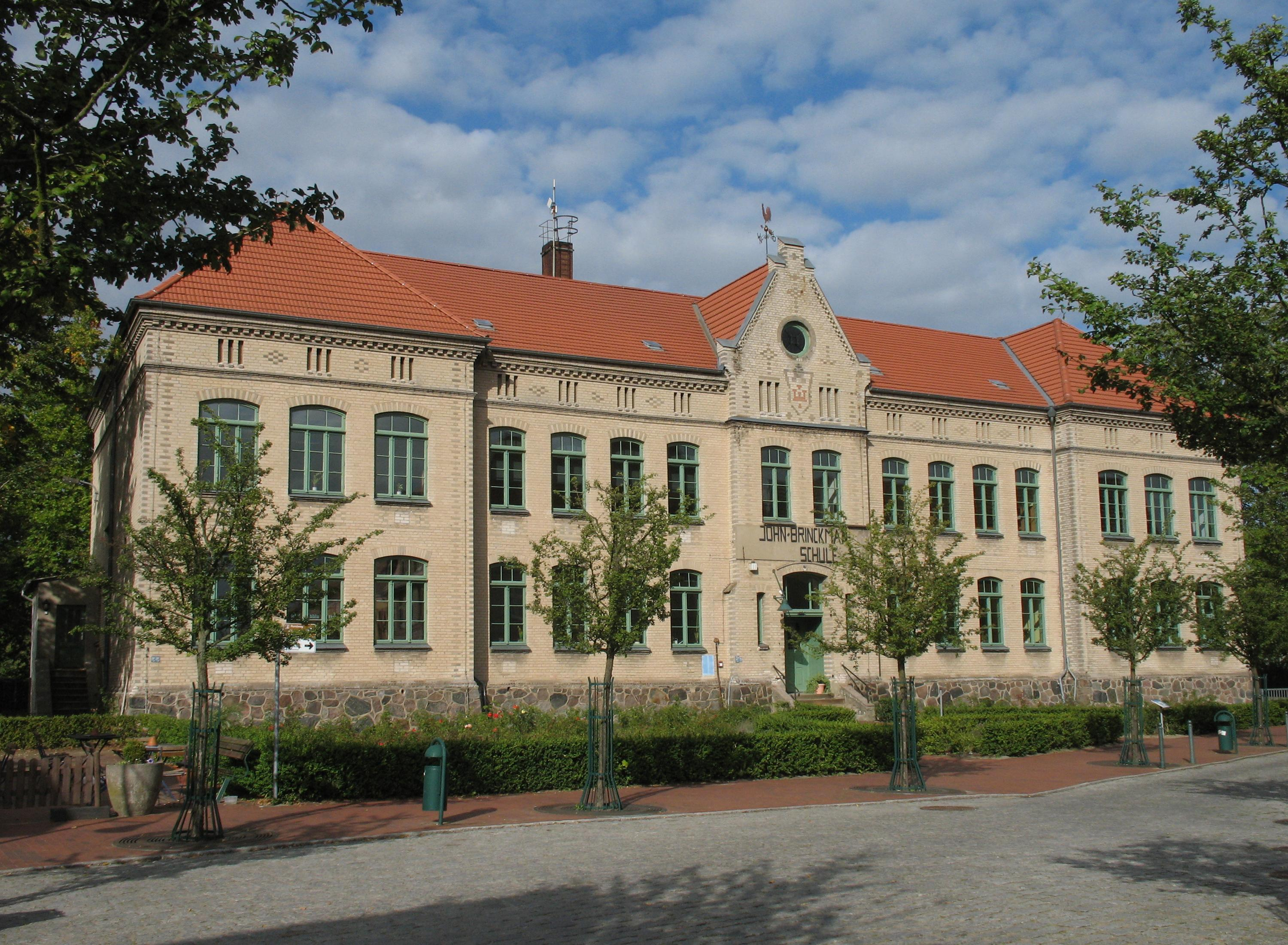
School building

Jungfernstraße

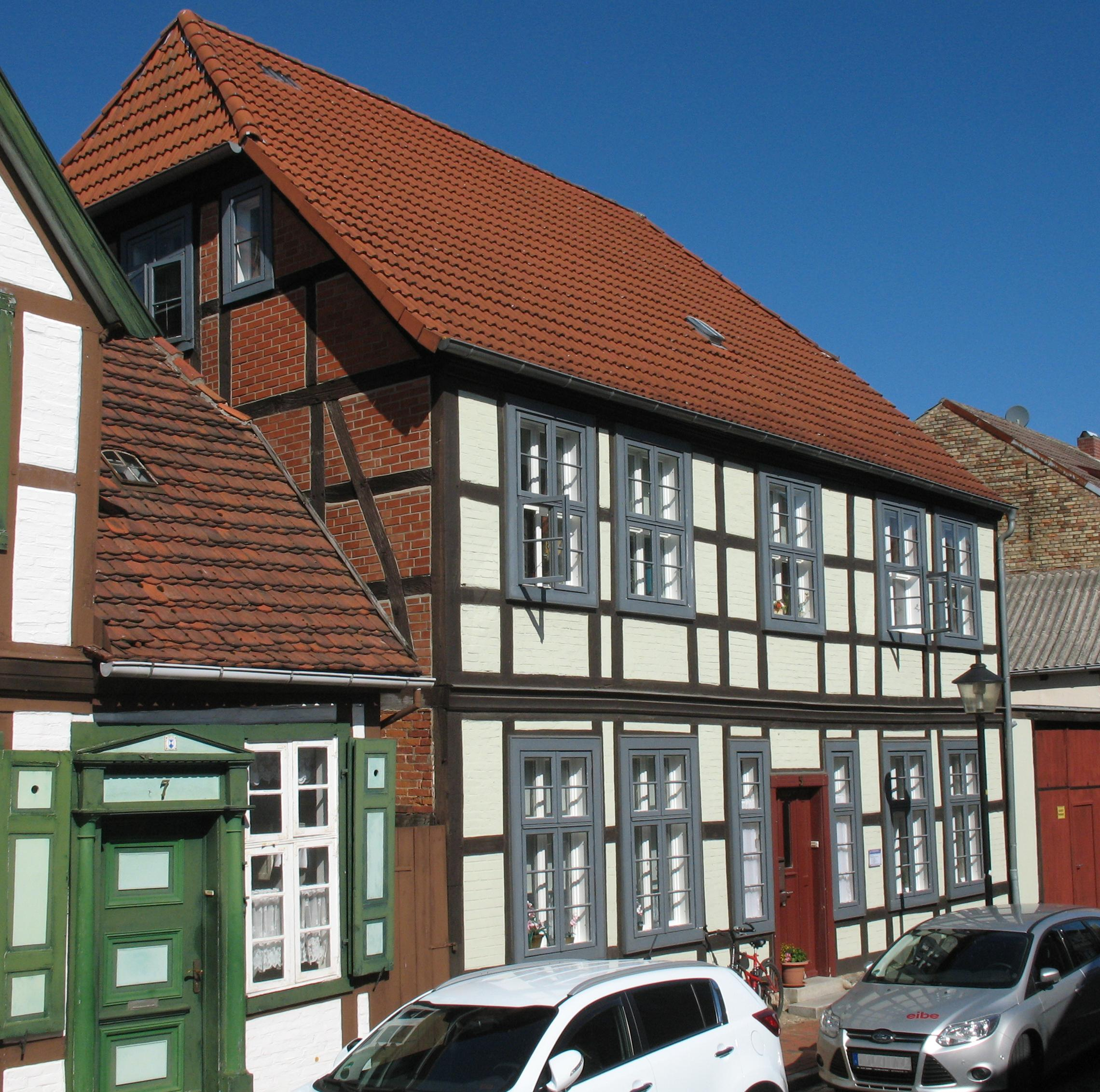

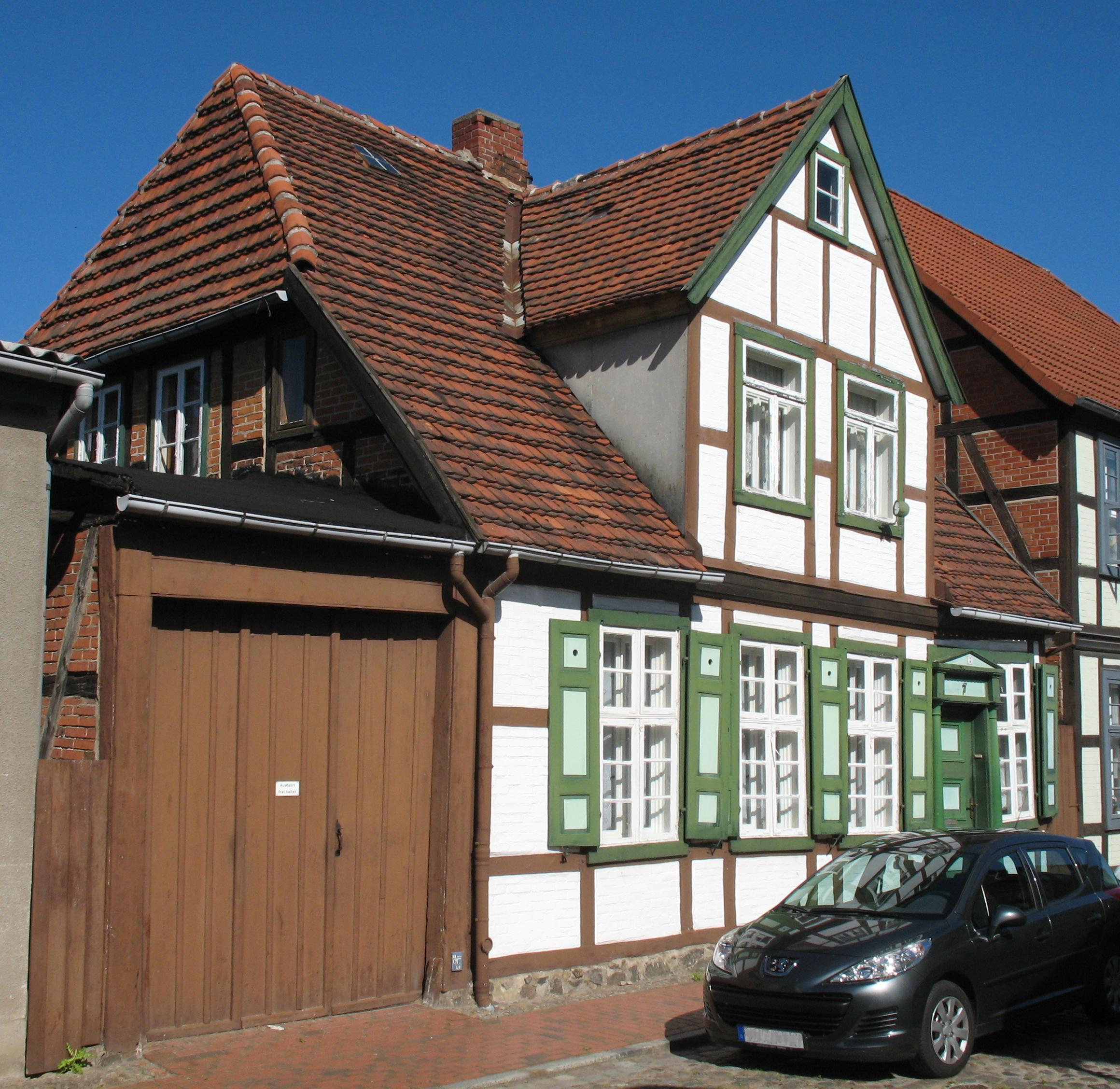

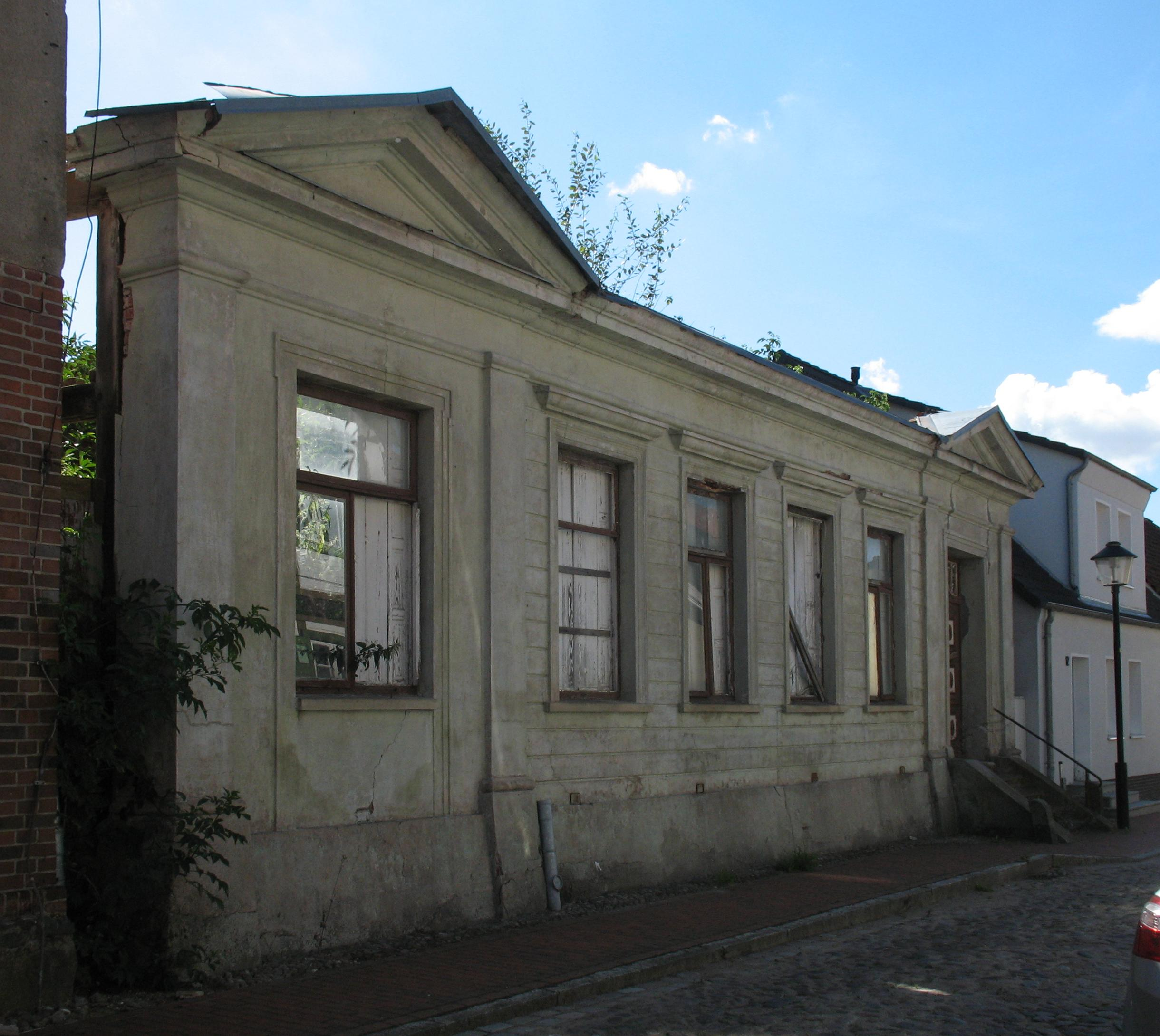

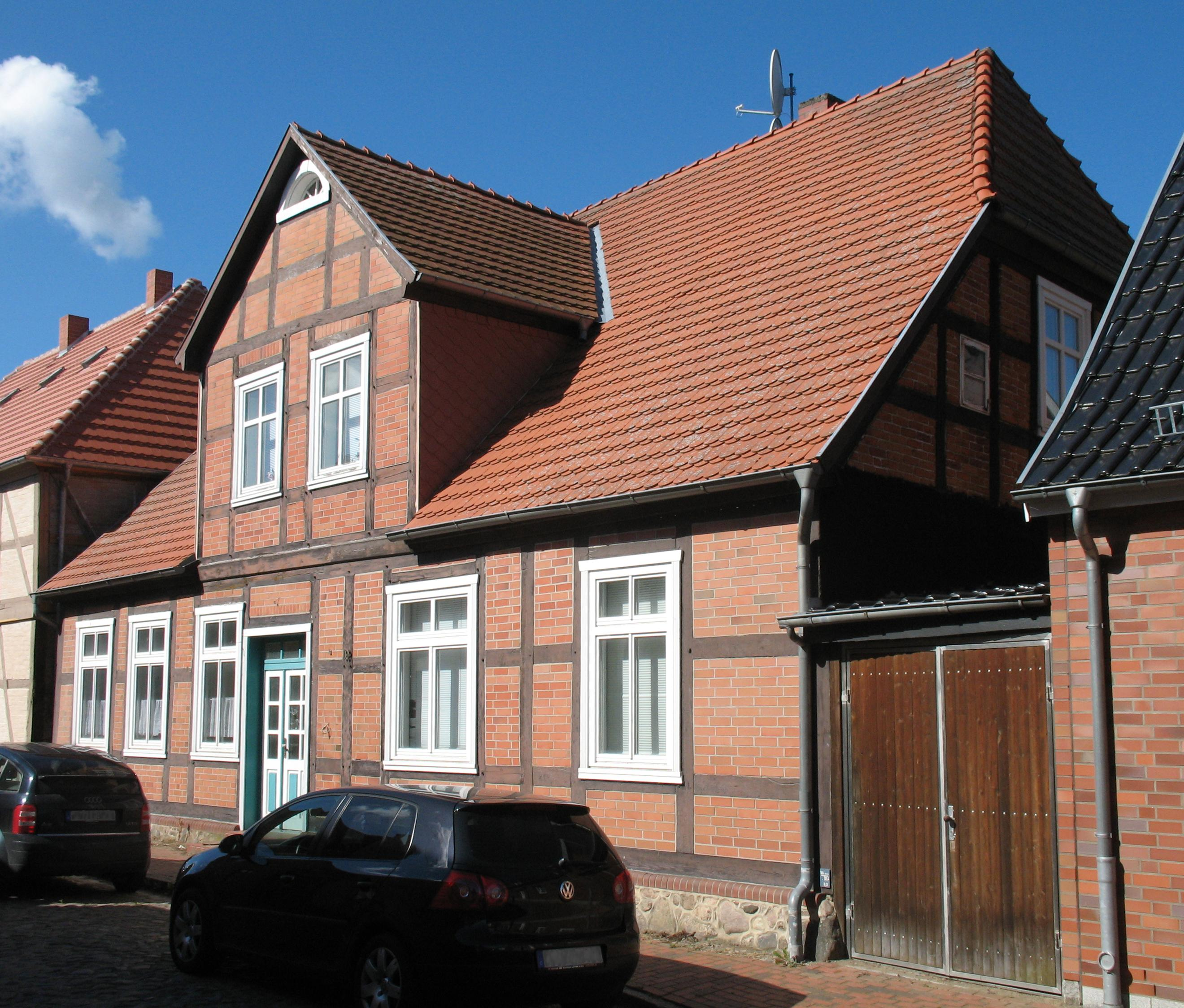

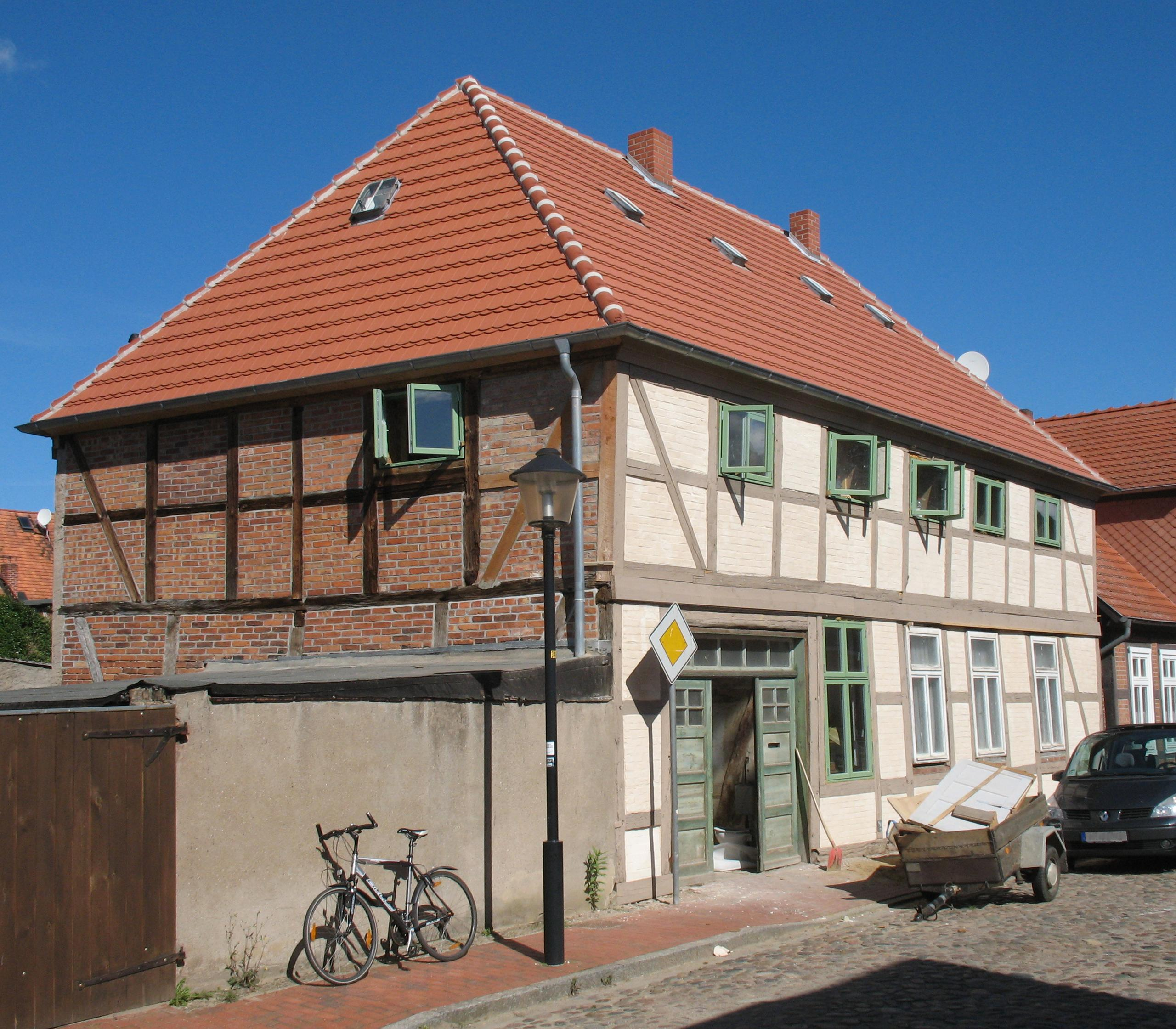

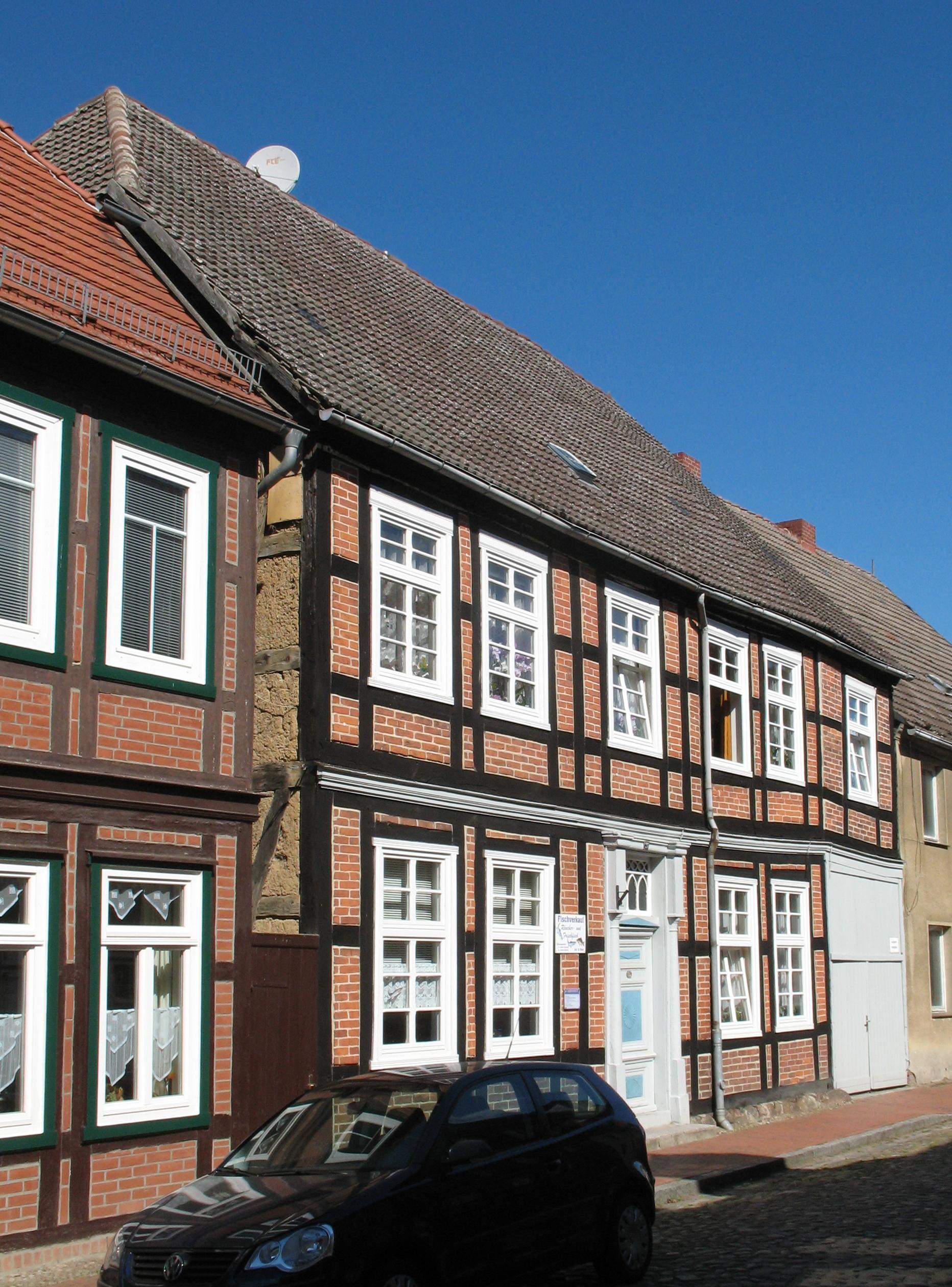

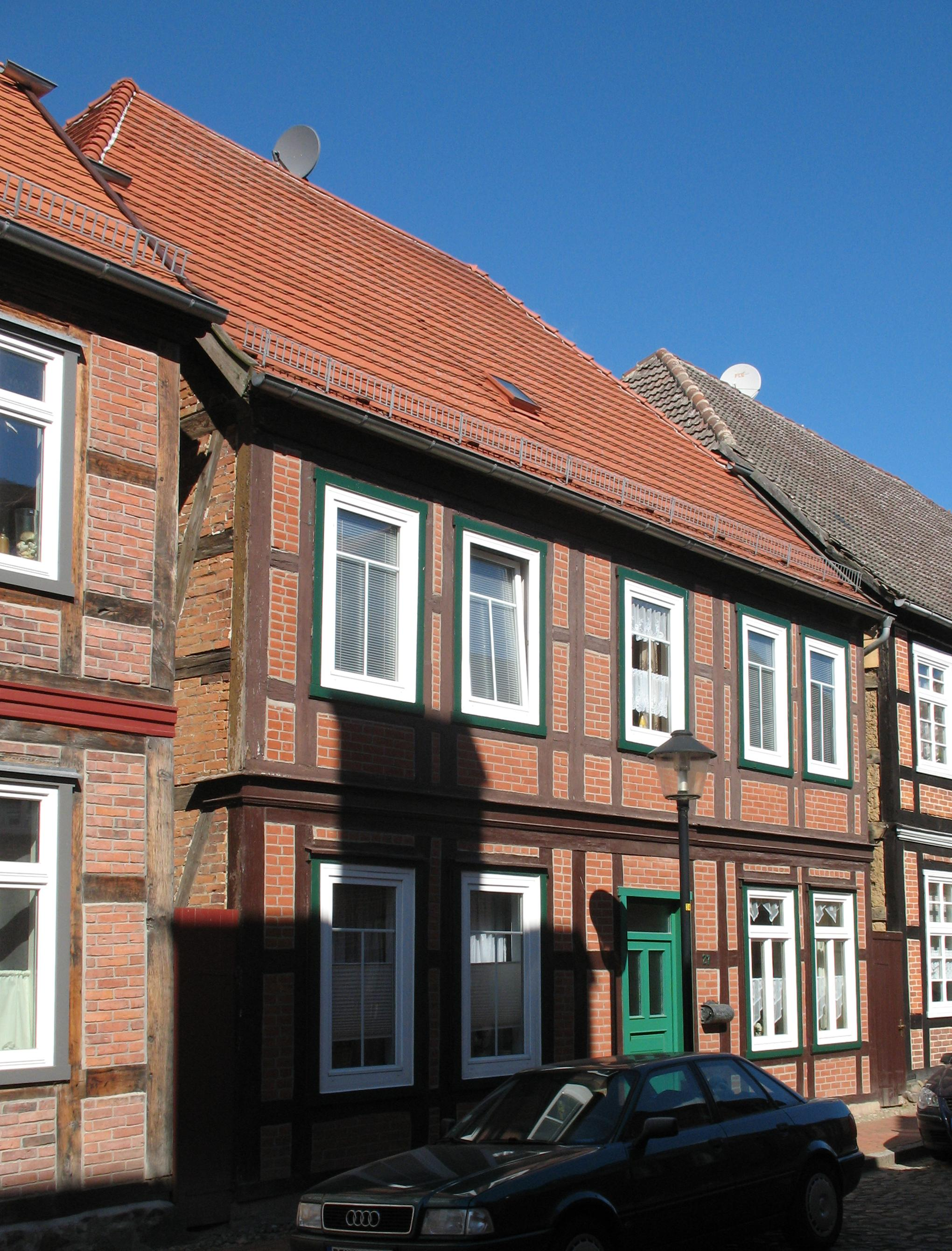
