= Ganzlin =

- Municipality
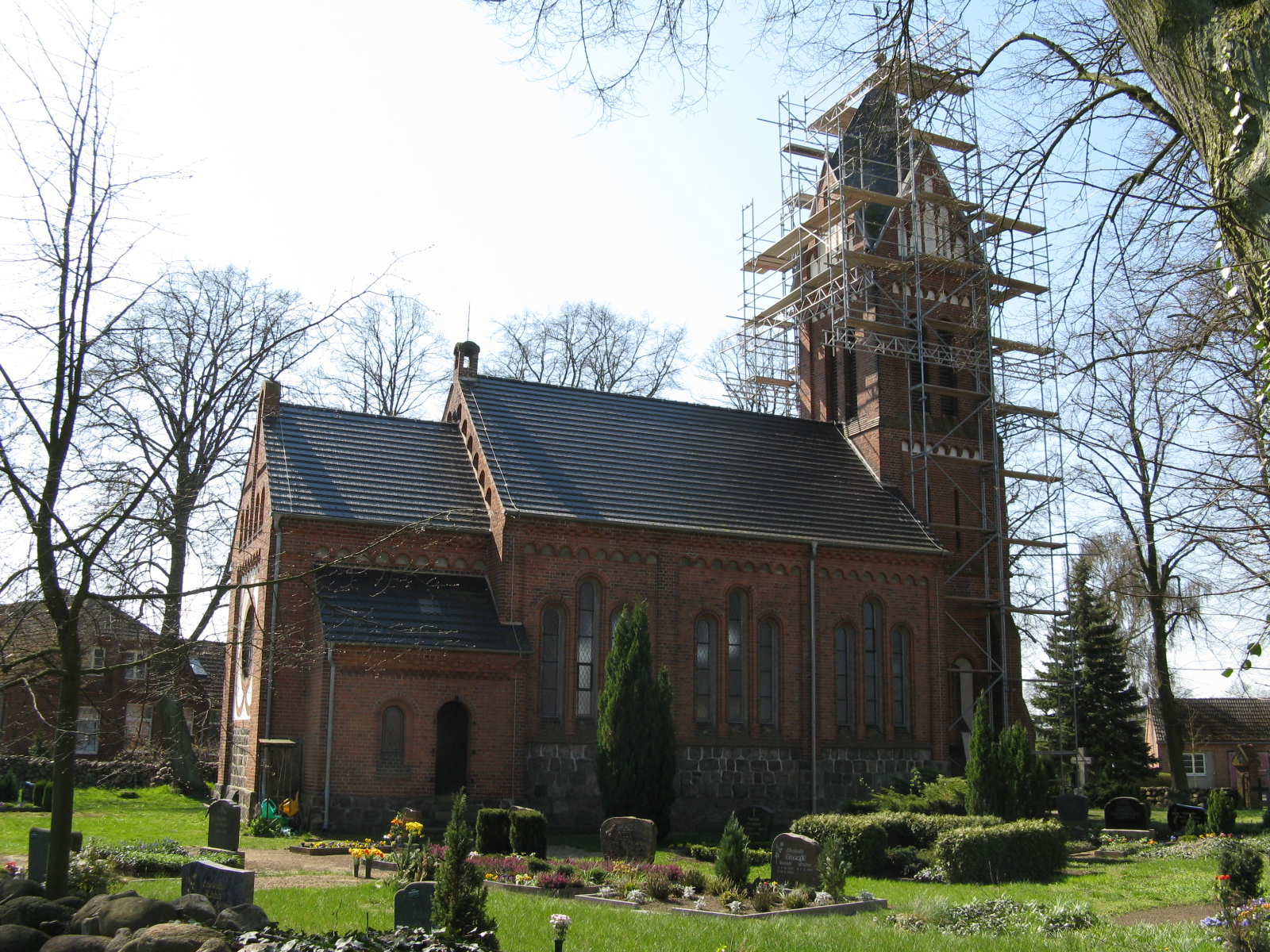
- Church

- Location of Ganzlin within Ludwigslust-Parchim district
- Interactive map of Ganzlin
- Location within Germany Location within Mecklenburg-Vorpommern
- Coordinates: 53°23′N 12°15′E
- Country: Germany
- State: Mecklenburg-Vorpommern
- District: Ludwigslust-Parchim
- Municipal assoc.: Plau am See

Government
  - Mayor: Jens Tiemer

Area
  - Total: 87.93 km^{2} (33.95 sq mi)
- Elevation: 86 m (282 ft)

Population (2025-12-31)
  - Total: 1,356
  - Density: 15.42/km^{2} (39.94/sq mi)
- Time zone: UTC+01:00 (CET)
  - Summer (DST): UTC+02:00 (CEST)
- Postal codes: 19395
- Dialling codes: 038737
- Vehicle registration: PCH
- Website: www.ganzlin.de

Ganzlin (German pronunciation: [ˈɡantsliːn]) is a municipality in the Ludwigslust-Parchim district, in Mecklenburg-Vorpommern, Germany.
