= Pinnow, Mecklenburg-Vorpommern =

Pinnow
- Municipality
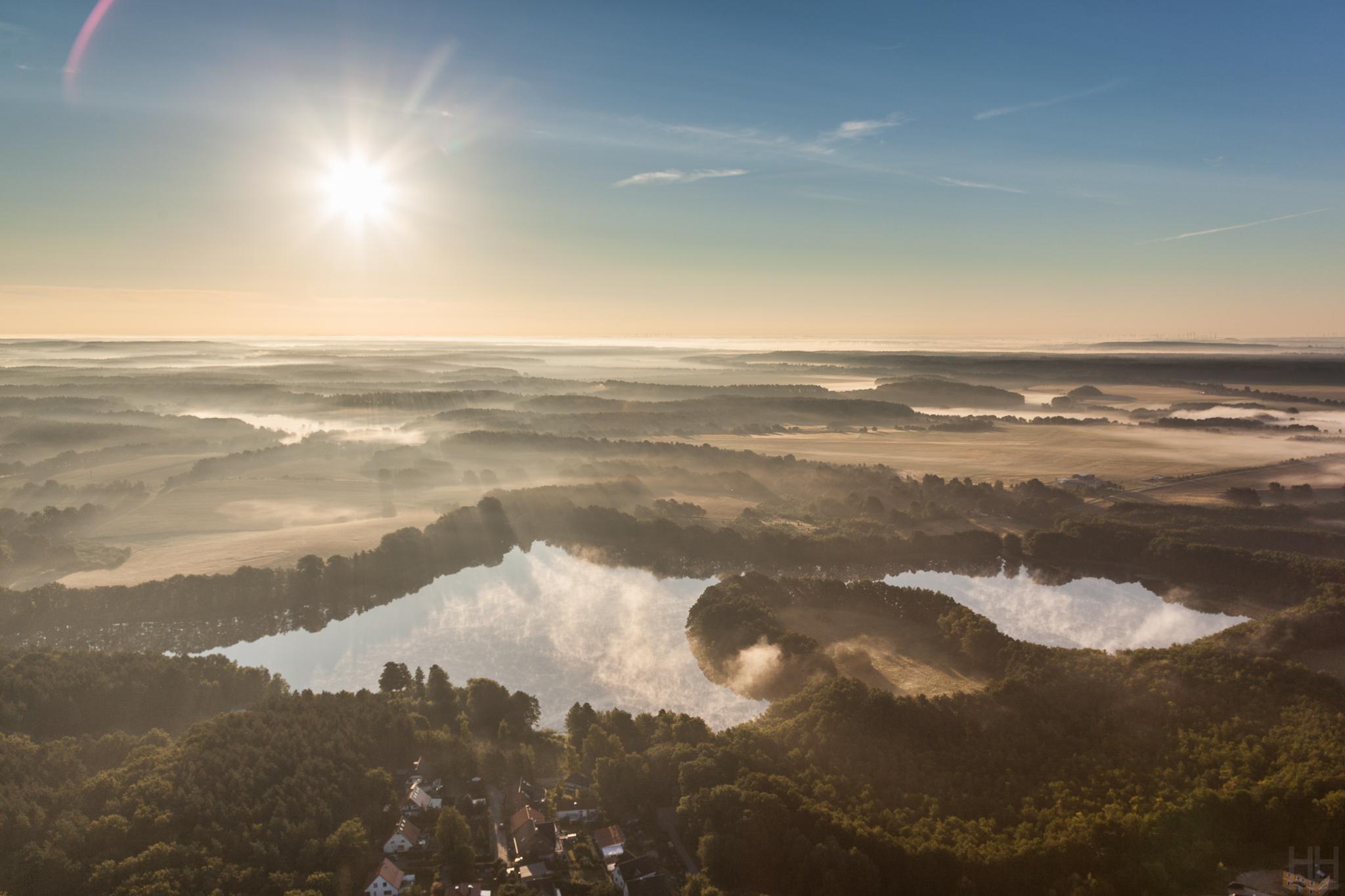
- Lake Mühlensee, Godern

- Coat of arms

- Location of Pinnow within Ludwigslust-Parchim district
- Interactive map of Pinnow
- Location within Germany Location within Mecklenburg-Vorpommern
- Coordinates: 53°36′08″N 11°32′50″E
- Country: Germany
- State: Mecklenburg-Vorpommern
- District: Ludwigslust-Parchim
- Municipal assoc.: Crivitz
- Subdivisions: 4

Government
  - Mayor: Andreas Zapf

Area
  - Total: 18.76 km^{2} (7.24 sq mi)
- Elevation: 44 m (144 ft)

Population (2025-12-31)
  - Total: 1,994
  - Density: 106.3/km^{2} (275.3/sq mi)
- Time zone: UTC+01:00 (CET)
  - Summer (DST): UTC+02:00 (CEST)
- Postal codes: 19065
- Dialling codes: 03860
- Vehicle registration: PCH

Pinnow is a municipality in the Ludwigslust-Parchim district, in Mecklenburg-Vorpommern, Germany.

== Links ==
Media related to Pinnow (bei Schwerin) at Wikimedia Commons
