= List of lakes of Ludwigslust-Parchim =

Lakes in the Ludwigslust-Parchim district, Mecklenburg-Vorpommern, Germany are:

Lake Name	Elevation	Surface Area
Barniner See	36.3 m (119 ft)	2.55 km^{2} (0.98 mi^{2})
Borkower See	36 m (118 ft)	0.196 km^{2} (0.076 mi^{2})
Crivitzer See	39.4 m (129 ft)	0.37 km^{2} (0.14 mi^{2})
Damerower See	47.5 m (156 ft)	2.85 km^{2} (1.10 mi^{2})
Goldberger See	46.5 m (153 ft)	7.7 km^{2} (3.0 mi^{2})
Keezer See	22.6 m (74 ft)	1.17 km^{2} (0.45 mi^{2})
Kiessee Dreenkrögen	35 m (115 ft)	0.068 km^{2} (0.026 mi^{2})
Kiessee Neu Zachun	34.4 m (113 ft)	0.1 km^{2} (0.039 mi^{2})
Kleinpritzer See	36.6 m (120 ft)	2.42 km^{2} (0.93 mi^{2})
Kraaker Kiessee	32.4 m (106 ft)	0.068 km^{2} (0.026 mi^{2})
Kritzower See	60 m (200 ft)	0.63 km^{2} (0.24 mi^{2})
Luckower See	9.9 m (32 ft)	0.435 km^{2} (0.168 mi^{2})
Neustädter See	33.4 m (110 ft)	1.29 km^{2} (0.50 mi^{2})
Passower See	51.1 m (168 ft)	0.36 km^{2} (0.14 mi^{2})
Plauer See (Note: While the vast majority of the lake is located in Ludwigslust-Parchim, two of its bays lie within Mecklenburgische Seenplatte.)	62 m (203 ft)	38.4 km^{2} (14.8 mi^{2})
Roter See (Brüel)	23.1 m (76 ft)	0.071 km^{2} (0.027 mi^{2})
Settiner See	42 m (138 ft)	0.5 km^{2} (0.19 mi^{2})
Trenntsee	8.6 m (28 ft)	1.06 km^{2} (0.41 mi^{2})
Woezer See	35.1 m (115 ft)	0.57 km^{2} (0.22 mi^{2})
Woseriner See	37.2 m (122 ft)	2.35 km^{2} (0.91 mi^{2})

== See also ==
- List of lakes of Mecklenburg-Vorpommern
- List of lakes of Mecklenburgische Seenplatte
- List of lakes of Nordwestmecklenburg
