= Mildenitz (river) =

River in Germany

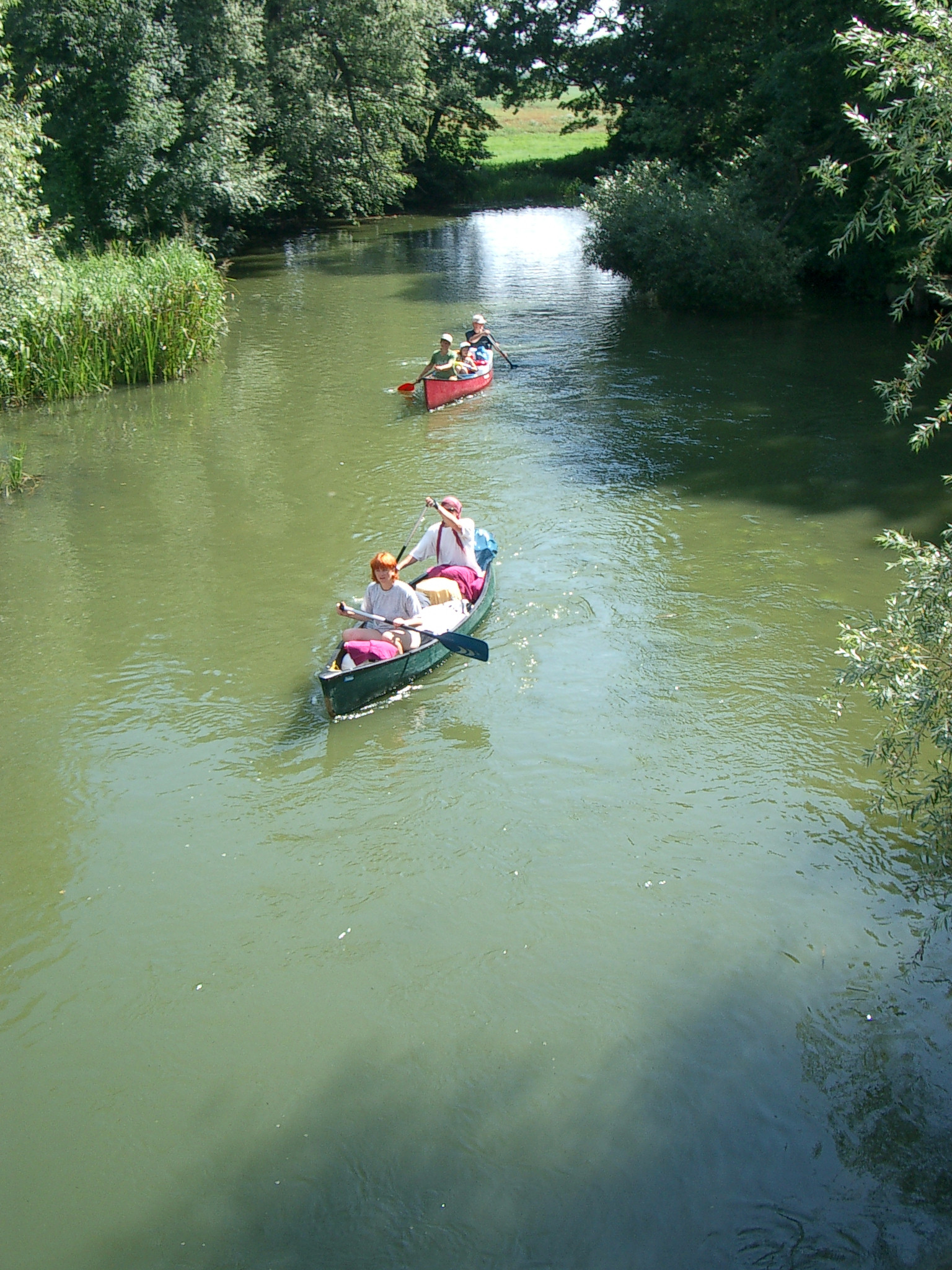

Location
- Country: Germany
- States: Mecklenburg-Vorpommern

Physical characteristics
- Mouth
  - location: Warnow
  - coordinates: 53.7437°N 11.8337°E

Basin features
- Progression: Warnow→ Baltic Sea
- Tributaries
  - right: Bresenitz

The Mildenitz is a river of Mecklenburg-Vorpommern, Germany. It flows into the Warnow near Sternberger Burg. Its source is near Karow. Its course leads through a number of lakes: Damerower See, Goldberger See, Dobbertiner See, Schwarzer See, Borkower See, Rothener See, Trenntsee and Großer Sternberger See.

== See also ==
- List of rivers of Mecklenburg-Vorpommern
