= Neuhof =

Neuhof may refer to:

== Places ==
=== In Austria ===
- Neuhof, Austria, a part of Untersiebenbrunn

=== In the Czech Republic ===
- Neuhof, the old German name of Nový Dvůr, near Nymburk

=== In France ===
- Neuhof, Strasbourg, a district in the south of Strasbourg

=== In Germany ===
- Neuhof (Hamburg-Wilhelmsburg), a district in the port area of Hamburg, Germany
- Neuhof, Hesse, a municipality near Fulda, Hesse
- Neuhof, Lower Saxony, in the Hildesheim district, Lower Saxony
- Neuhof an der Zenn, in the Neustadt (Aisch)-Bad Windsheim district, Bavaria
- Penkun-Neuhof, a part of Penkun in the Uecker-Randow district, Mecklenburg-Vorpommern
- Neuhöfer Karpfenteiche, ponds in the west of Mecklenburg-Vorpommern
- Neuhofer See, a lake in Landkreis Nordwestmecklenburg, Mecklenburg-Vorpommern
- Neuhof Substation, was a 110 kV electrical substation in Neuhof, Bad Sachsa, Lower Saxony
- Bahnhof Neuhof bei Zossen station, a railway station in the village of Neuhof, Brandenburg

=== In Poland ===
- Neuhof, the German name for Nowy Dwór, Gmina Koronowo, Bydgoszcz County, Kuyavian-Pomeranian Voivodeship, in north-central Poland
- Neuhof, the German name for Garbek, in Pomeranian Voivodeship, in northern Poland

=== In Romania ===
- Neuhof, the German name for Bogda Commune, Timiș County

=== In Switzerland ===
- Neuhof (Switzerland), an agricultural domain located in the municipality of Birr

=== In United States ===
- Neuhof Hutterite Colony in Mountain Lake Township, Cottonwood County, Minnesota

== See also ==
- Neuhofen
- Neuenhof (disambiguation)
