= Schwarzer See (Mildenitz) =

Lake in Mildenitz, Germany

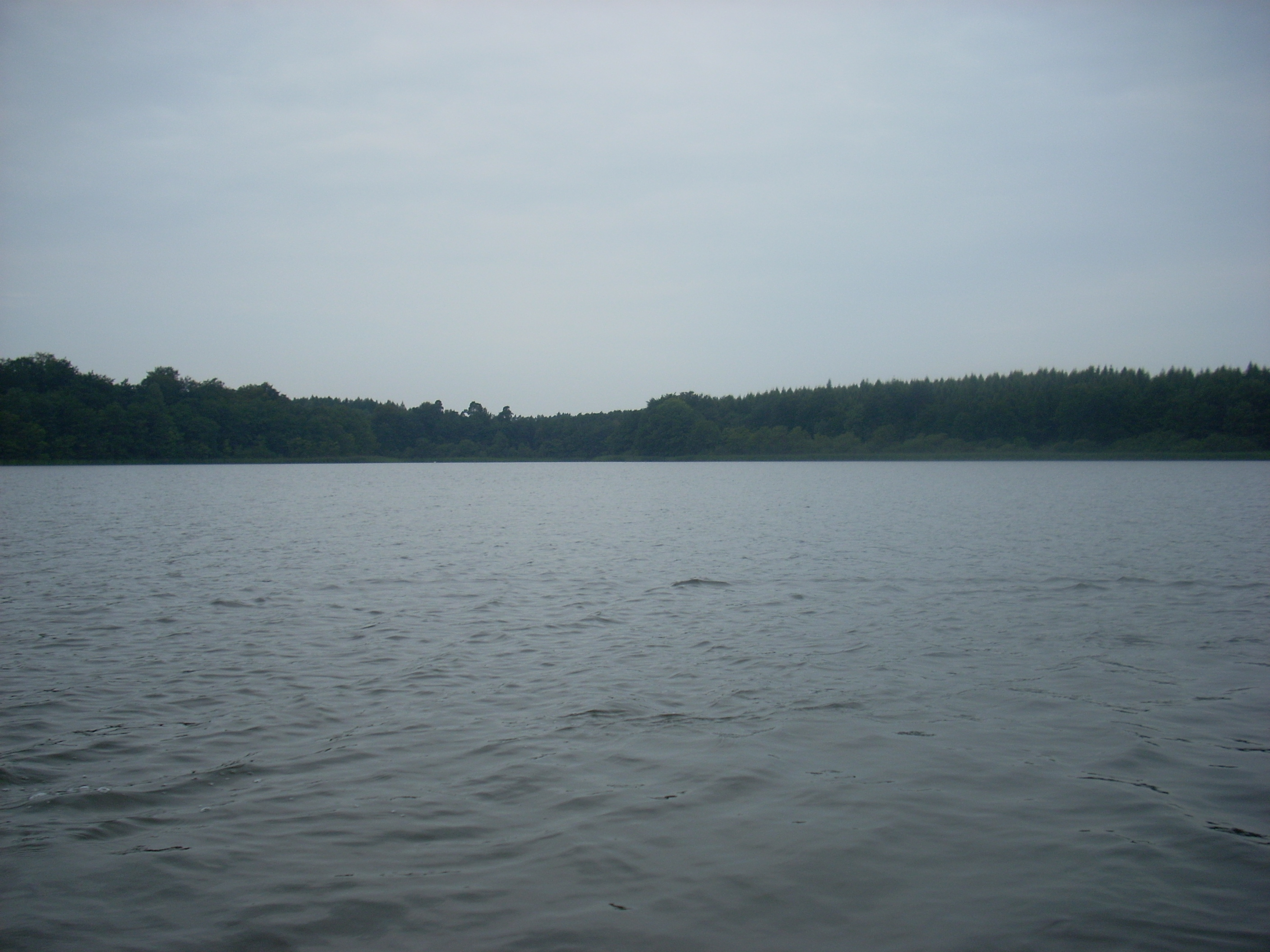

- Location within Mecklenburg-Vorpommern
- Location: Borkow, Ludwigslust-Parchim, Mecklenburg-Vorpommern
- Coordinates: 53°38′49″N 12°0′53″E
- Primary inflows: Mildenitz
- Primary outflows: Mildenitz
- Basin countries: Germany
- Surface area: 0.48 km^{2} (0.19 sq mi)

Schwarzer See is a lake at Borkow in Ludwigslust-Parchim, Mecklenburg-Vorpommern, Germany. Its surface area is 0.48 km².
