= Woseriner See =

Lake in Germany

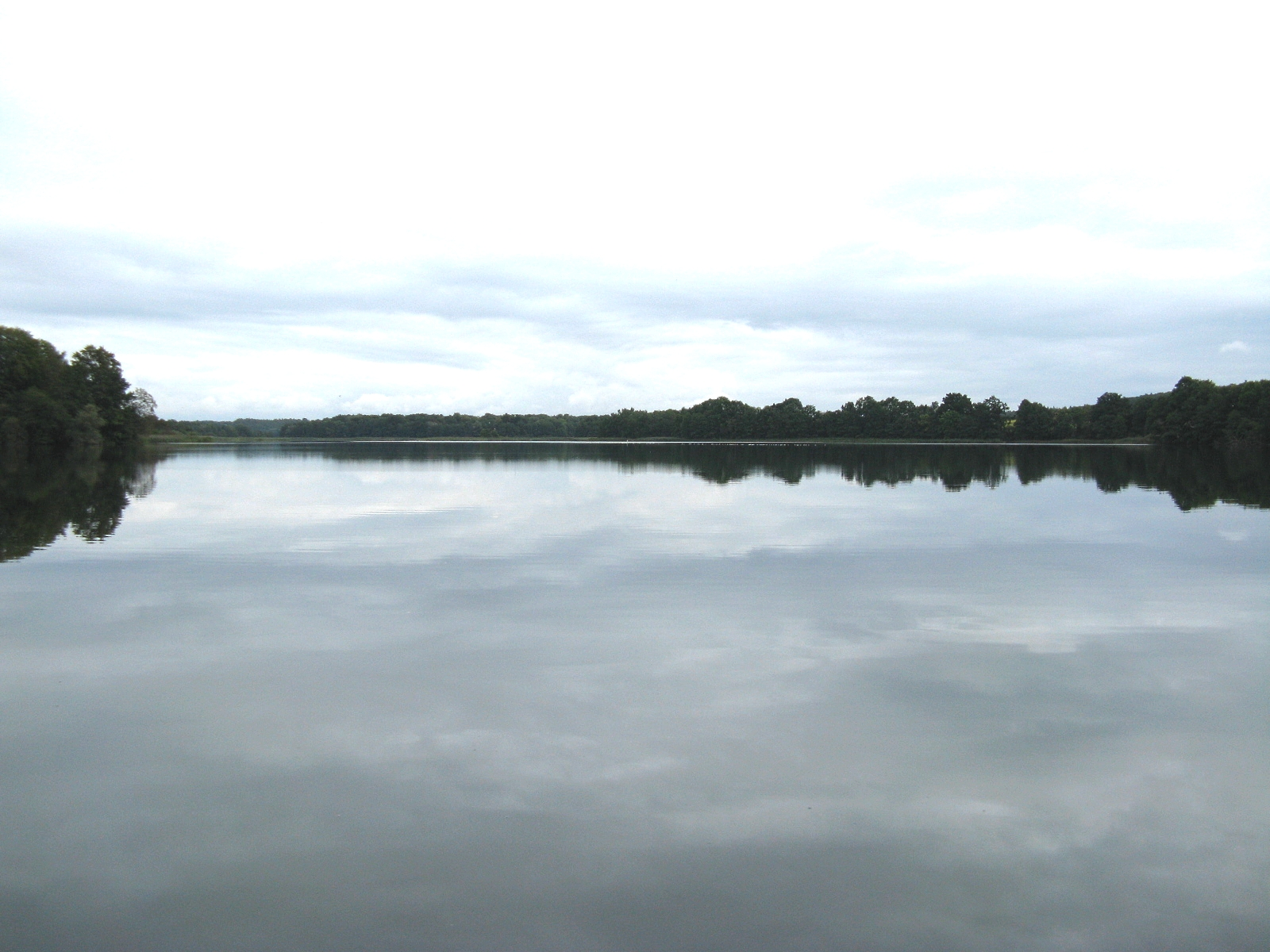

- Location within Mecklenburg-Vorpommern
- Location: Ludwigslust-Parchim, Mecklenburg-Vorpommern
- Coordinates: 53°40′10.06″N 12°1′53.05″E
- Primary inflows: Bresenitz
- Primary outflows: Bresenitz
- Catchment area: 75.8 km^{2} (29.3 sq mi)
- Basin countries: Germany
- Surface area: 2.35 km^{2} (0.91 sq mi)
- Average depth: 9.1 m (30 ft)
- Max. depth: 37.5 m (123 ft)
- Water volume: 19,670,000 m^{3} (695,000,000 cu ft)
- Surface elevation: 37.2 m (122 ft)

Woseriner See is a lake in the Ludwigslust-Parchim district in Mecklenburg-Vorpommern, Germany. At an elevation of 37.2 m, its surface area is 2.35 km^{2}.
