= Großer Sternberger See =

Lake in Mecklenburg-Vorpommern, Germany

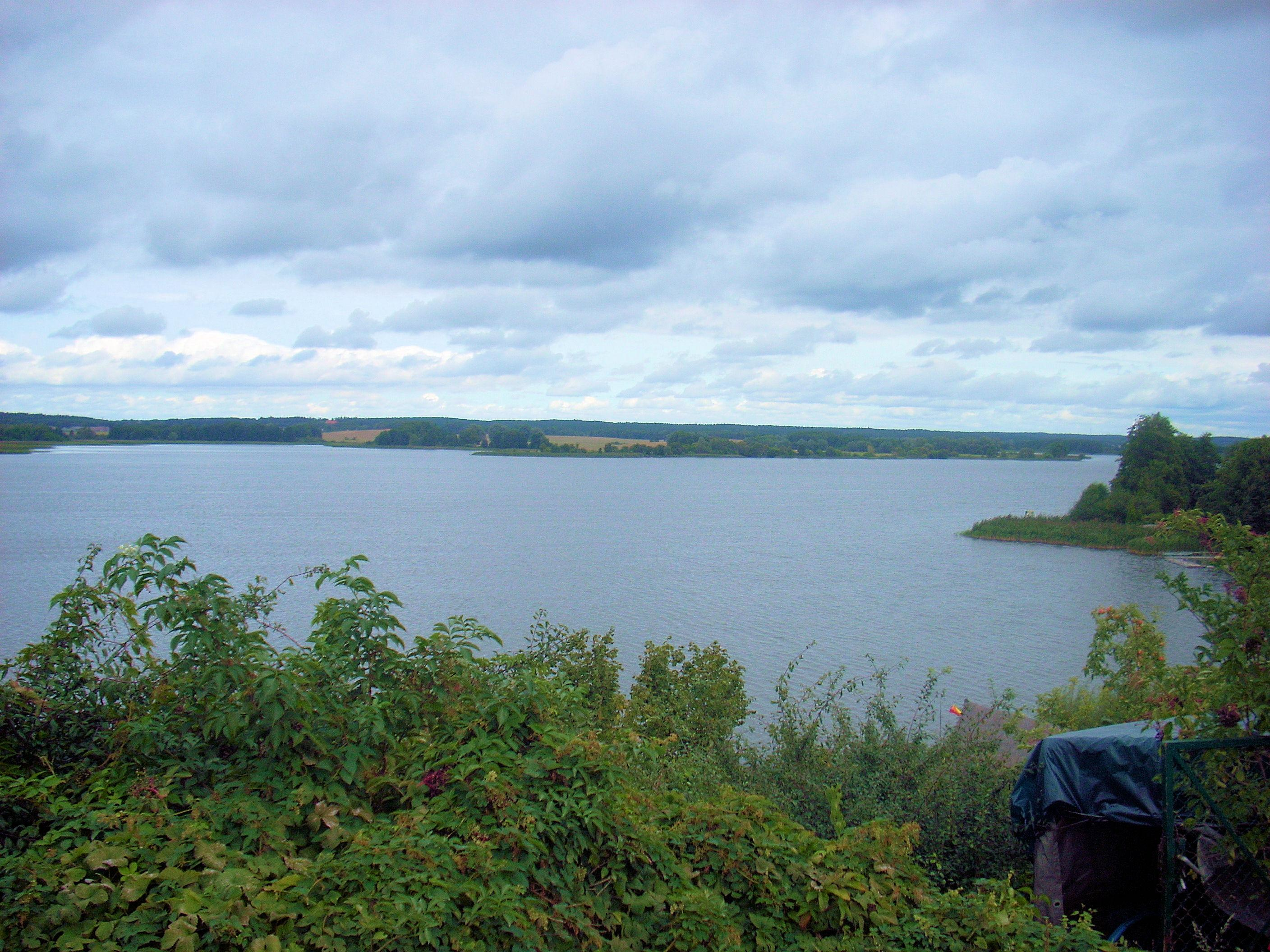

- Location within Mecklenburg-Vorpommern
- Location: Mecklenburg-Vorpommern
- Coordinates: 53°43′N 11°51′E
- Primary inflows: Mildenitz
- Primary outflows: Mildenitz
- Basin countries: Germany
- Surface area: 2.5 km^{2} (0.97 sq mi)
- Average depth: 3 m (9.8 ft)
- Max. depth: 7.9 m (26 ft)
- Surface elevation: 8.6 m (28 ft)
- Settlements: Sternberg

Großer Sternberger See is a lake in Mecklenburg-Vorpommern, Germany. It has a surface area is 2.5 km² and is at an elevation of 8.6 m. It is located just east of the city of Sternberg.

== See also ==
- Sternberg Lake District Nature Park
