= Bresenitz =

River in Germany

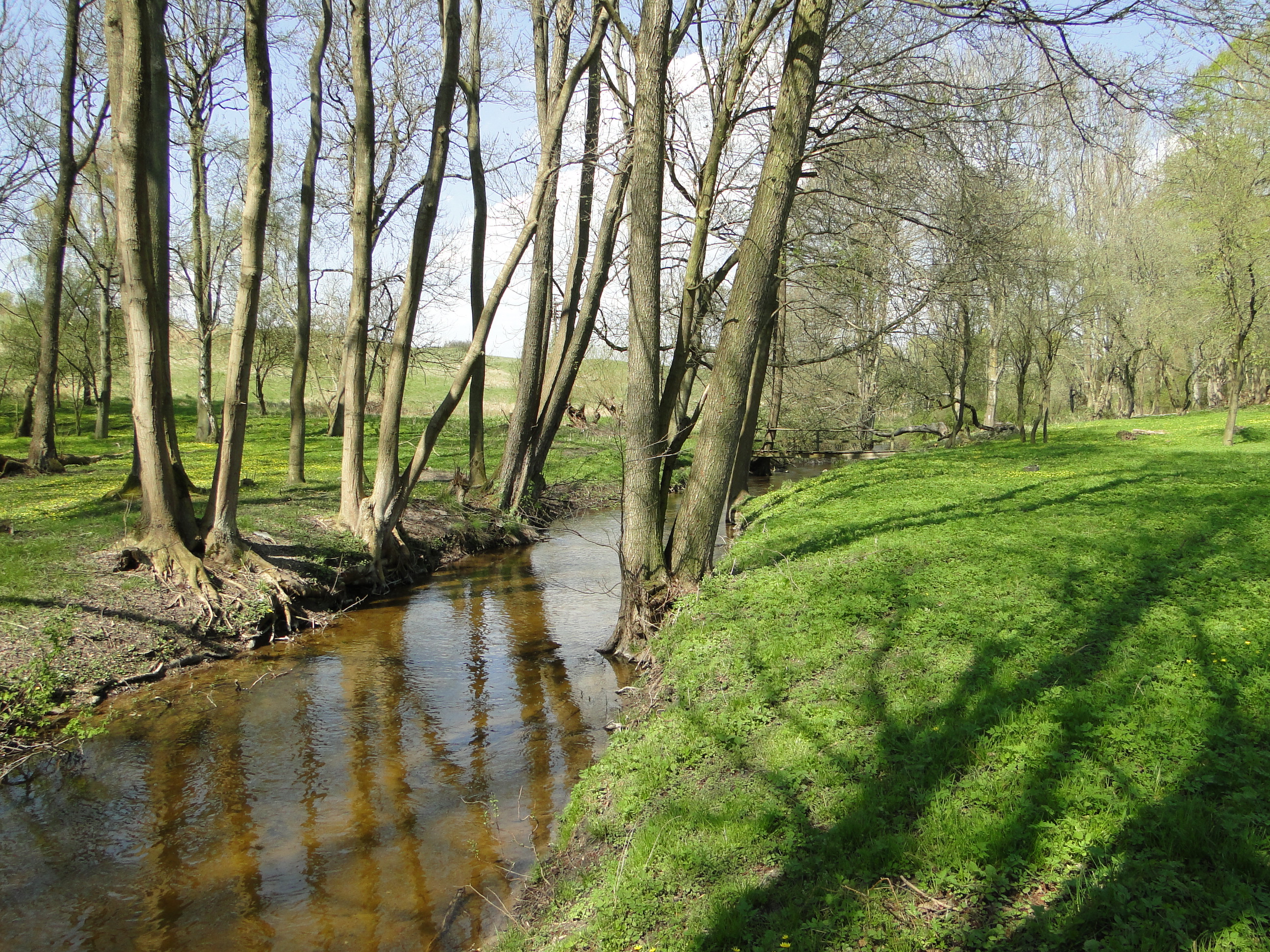

Location
- Country: Germany
- State: Mecklenburg-Vorpommern

Physical characteristics
- Mouth
  - location: Mildenitz
  - coordinates: 53.6526°N 11.9937°E

Basin features
- Progression: Mildenitz→ Warnow→ Baltic Sea

The Bresenitz is a river of Mecklenburg-Vorpommern, Germany. It flows into the Mildenitz near Woserin.

== See also ==
- List of rivers of Mecklenburg-Vorpommern
