= Kiessee Neu Zachun =

Lake in Mecklenburg-Vorpommern, Germany

- Location within Mecklenburg-Vorpommern
- Location: Ludwigslust-Parchim, Mecklenburg-Vorpommern
- Coordinates: 53°28′55″N 11°17′49″E
- Basin countries: Germany
- Surface area: 0.1 km^{2} (0.039 sq mi)
- Shore length^{1}: 1.26 km (0.78 mi)
- Surface elevation: 34.4 m (113 ft)
- ^{1} Shore length is not a well-defined measure.

Kiessee Neu Zachun is a lake in the Ludwigslust-Parchim district in Mecklenburg-Vorpommern, Germany. At an elevation of 34.4 m, its surface area is 0.1 km².
