= Damerower See =

Reservoir in Germany

- Location within Mecklenburg-Vorpommern

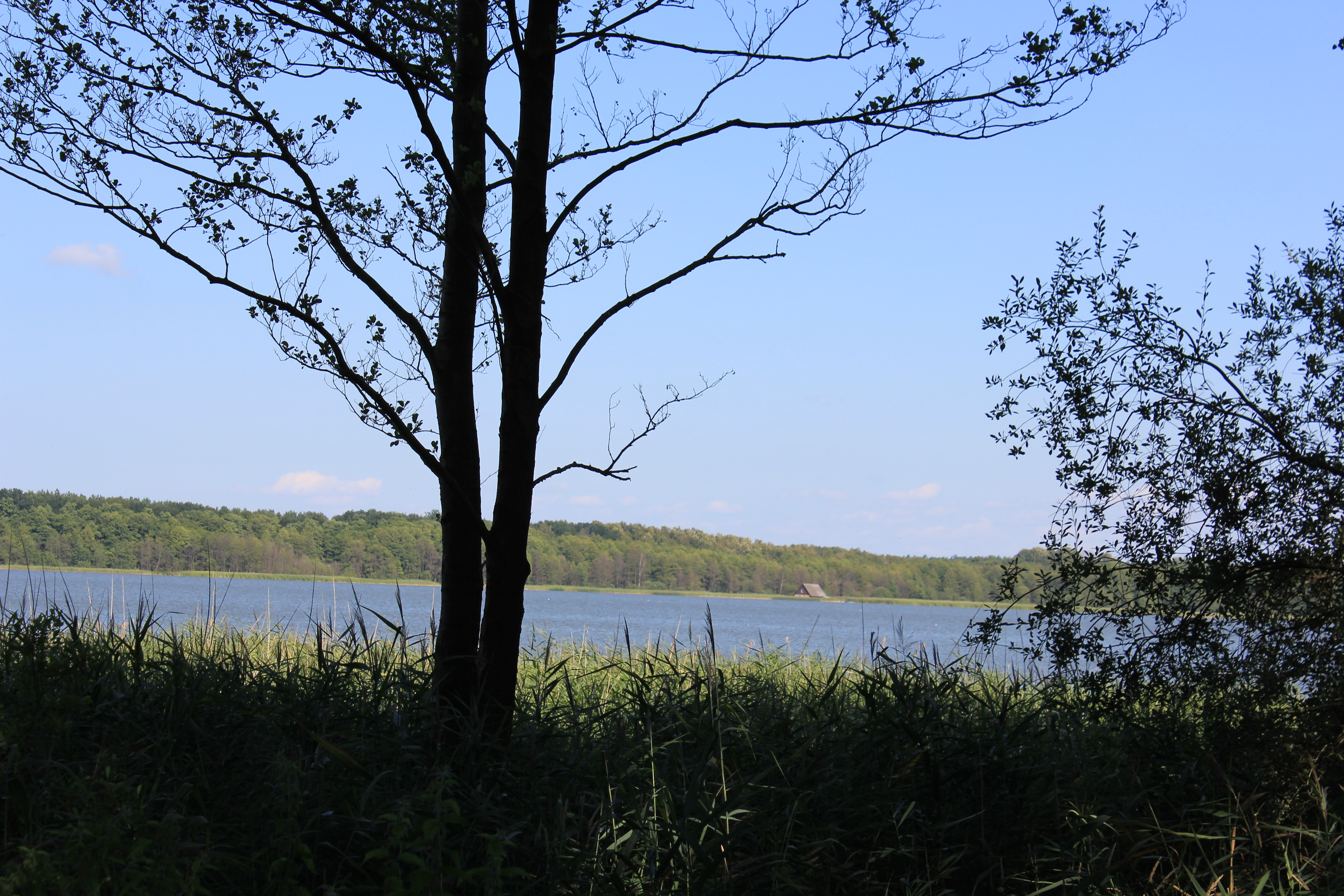
- view of the lake from Neu Damerow
- Location: Ludwigslust-Parchim, Mecklenburg-Vorpommern
- Coordinates: 53°33′52″N 12°12′23″E
- Primary inflows: Mildenitz
- Primary outflows: Mildenitz
- Basin countries: Germany
- Surface area: 2.85 km^{2} (1.10 sq mi)
- Average depth: 2.0 m (6 ft 7 in)
- Max. depth: 7 m (23 ft)
- Surface elevation: 47.5 m (156 ft)

Damerower See is a lake in Ludwigslust-Parchim, Mecklenburg-Vorpommern, Germany. At an elevation of 47.5 m, its surface area is 2.85 km^{2}.
