= Passower See =

Lake in Mecklenburg-Vorpommern, Germany

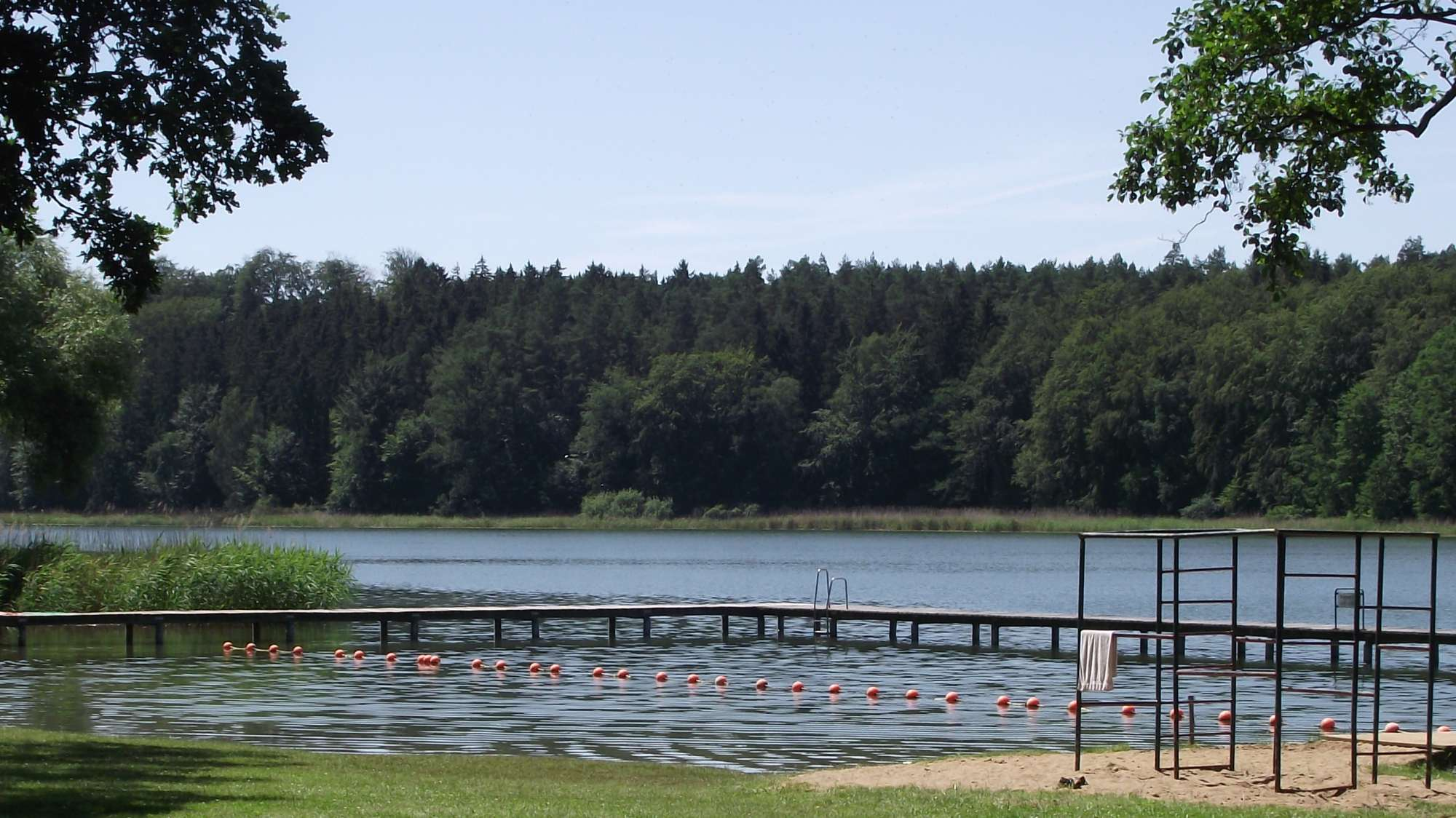
- Passower See Badestelle

- Location within Mecklenburg-Vorpommern
- Location: Ludwigslust-Parchim, Mecklenburg-Vorpommern
- Coordinates: 53°29′43.44″N 12°3′3.5″E
- Basin countries: Germany
- Surface area: 0.36 km^{2} (0.14 sq mi)
- Average depth: 3 m (9.8 ft)
- Max. depth: 9 m (30 ft)
- Surface elevation: 51.1 m (168 ft)

Passower See is a lake in the Ludwigslust-Parchim district in Mecklenburg-Vorpommern, Germany. At an elevation of 51.1 m, its surface area is 0.36 km^{2}.
