= Crivitzer See =

Lake in Mecklenburg-Vorpommern, Germany

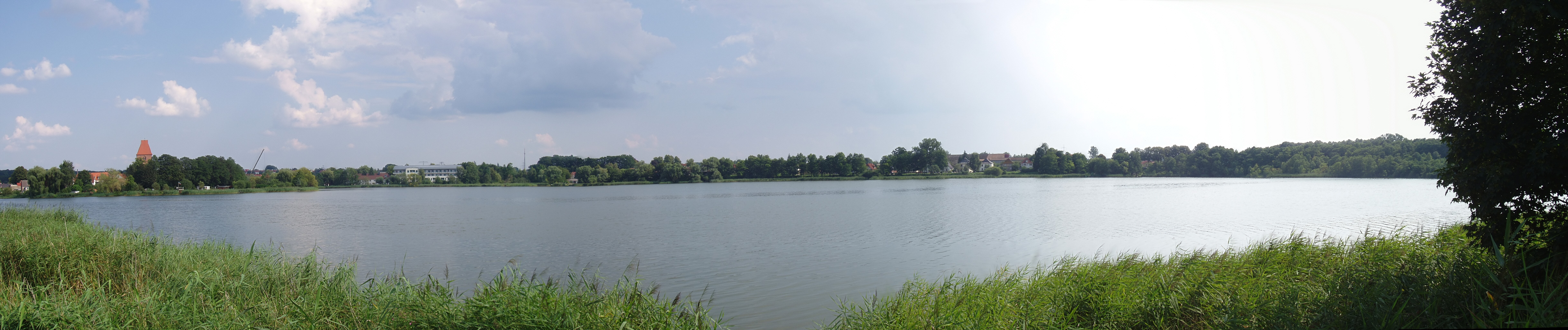

- Location within Germany Location within Mecklenburg-Vorpommern
- Location: Ludwigslust-Parchim, Mecklenburg-Vorpommern
- Coordinates: 53°34′37″N 11°38′30″E
- Basin countries: Germany
- Surface area: 0.37 km^{2} (0.14 sq mi)
- Surface elevation: 39.4 m (129 ft)
- Settlements: Crivitz

Crivitzer See is a lake in the Ludwigslust-Parchim district in Mecklenburg-Vorpommern, Germany. At an elevation of 39.4 m, its surface area is 0.37 km^{2}.
