= Neuenhof =

Neuenhof may refer to the following places:

== In Switzerland ==
- Neuenhof, Aargau, in the Canton of Aargau

== In Germany ==
- Neuenhof (Attendorn), a part of Attendorn in the Olpe district, North Rhine-Westphalia
- Neuenhof (Balje), a part of Balje in the Stade district, Lower Saxony
- Neuenhof (Eisenach), a part of Eisenach in the Wartburgkreis, Thuringia
- Neuenhof (Kircheib), a part of Kircheib in the Altenkirchen district, Rhineland-Palatinate
- Neuenhof (Radevormwald), a part of Radevormwald in the Oberbergischer Kreis, North Rhine-Westphalia
- Neuenhof (Ruppichteroth), a part of Ruppichteroth in the Rhein-Sieg district, North Rhine-Westphalia
- Neuenhof (Windeck), a part of Windeck in the Rhein-Sieg district, North Rhine-Westphalia
- Neuenhof Castle, a 17th-century water castle near Lüdenscheid in the Märkischer Kreis, North Rhine-Westphalia
