= Roter See (Brüel) =

Lake in Germany

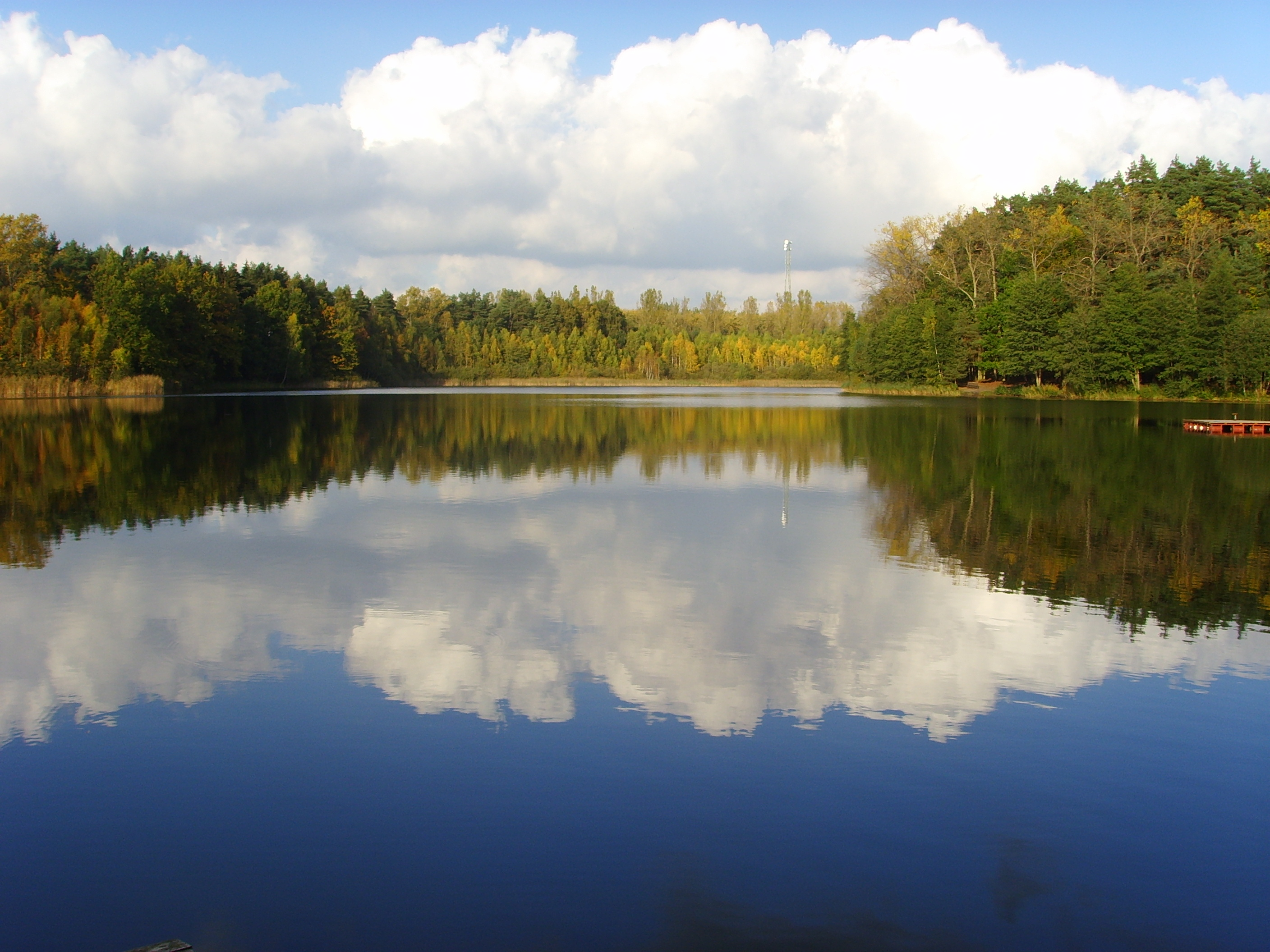

- Location within Mecklenburg-Vorpommern
- Location: Ludwigslust-Parchim, Mecklenburg-Vorpommern
- Coordinates: 53°43′9.35″N 11°43′29.8″E
- Primary outflows: none
- Basin countries: Germany
- Surface area: 0.071 km^{2} (0.027 sq mi)
- Max. depth: 10 m (33 ft)
- Surface elevation: 23.1 m (76 ft)

Roter See is a lake in the Ludwigslust-Parchim district in Mecklenburg-Vorpommern, Germany. At an elevation of 23.1 m, its surface area is 0.071 km^{2}.
