= Woezer See =

Lake in Mecklenburg-Vorpommern, Germany

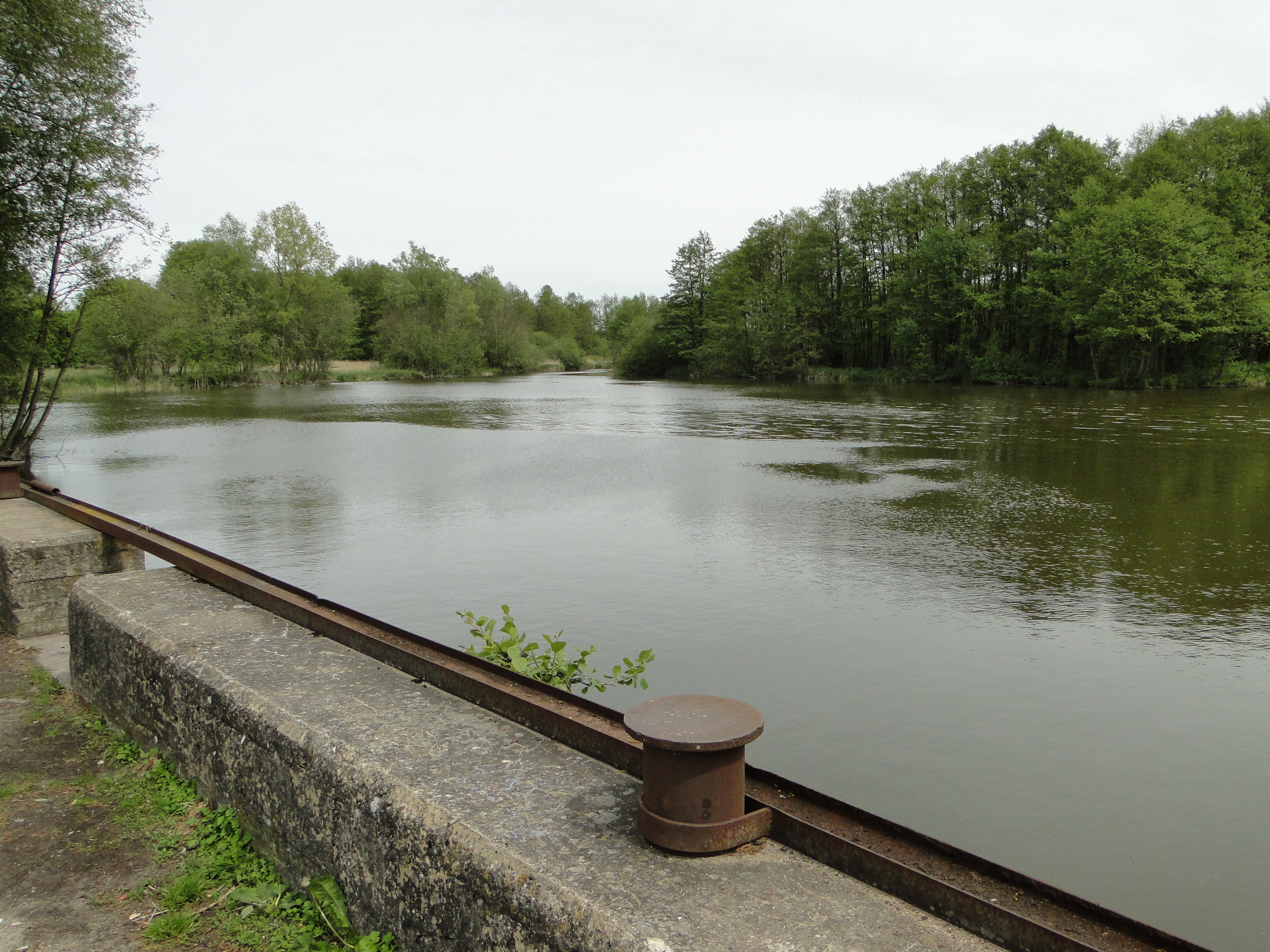

- Location within Mecklenburg-Vorpommern
- Location: Ludwigslust-Parchim, Mecklenburg-Vorpommern
- Coordinates: 53.58164°N 11.08213°E
- Primary inflows: Schilde
- Primary outflows: Schilde, Düsterbeck
- Basin countries: Germany
- Max. length: 1.342 km (0.834 mi)
- Max. width: 0.686 km (0.426 mi)
- Surface area: 0.57 km^{2} (0.22 sq mi)
- Average depth: 1.1 m (3 ft 7 in)
- Max. depth: 1.6 m (5 ft 3 in)
- Water volume: 610,000 m^{3} (22,000,000 cu ft)
- Shore length^{1}: 3.5 km (2.2 mi)
- Surface elevation: 35.1 m (115 ft)
- ^{1} Shore length is not a well-defined measure.

Woezer See is a lake in the Ludwigslust-Parchim district in Mecklenburg-Vorpommern, Germany. At an elevation of 35.1 m, its surface area is 0.57 km^{2}.
