= Trenntsee =

Lake in Mecklenburg-Vorpommern, Germany

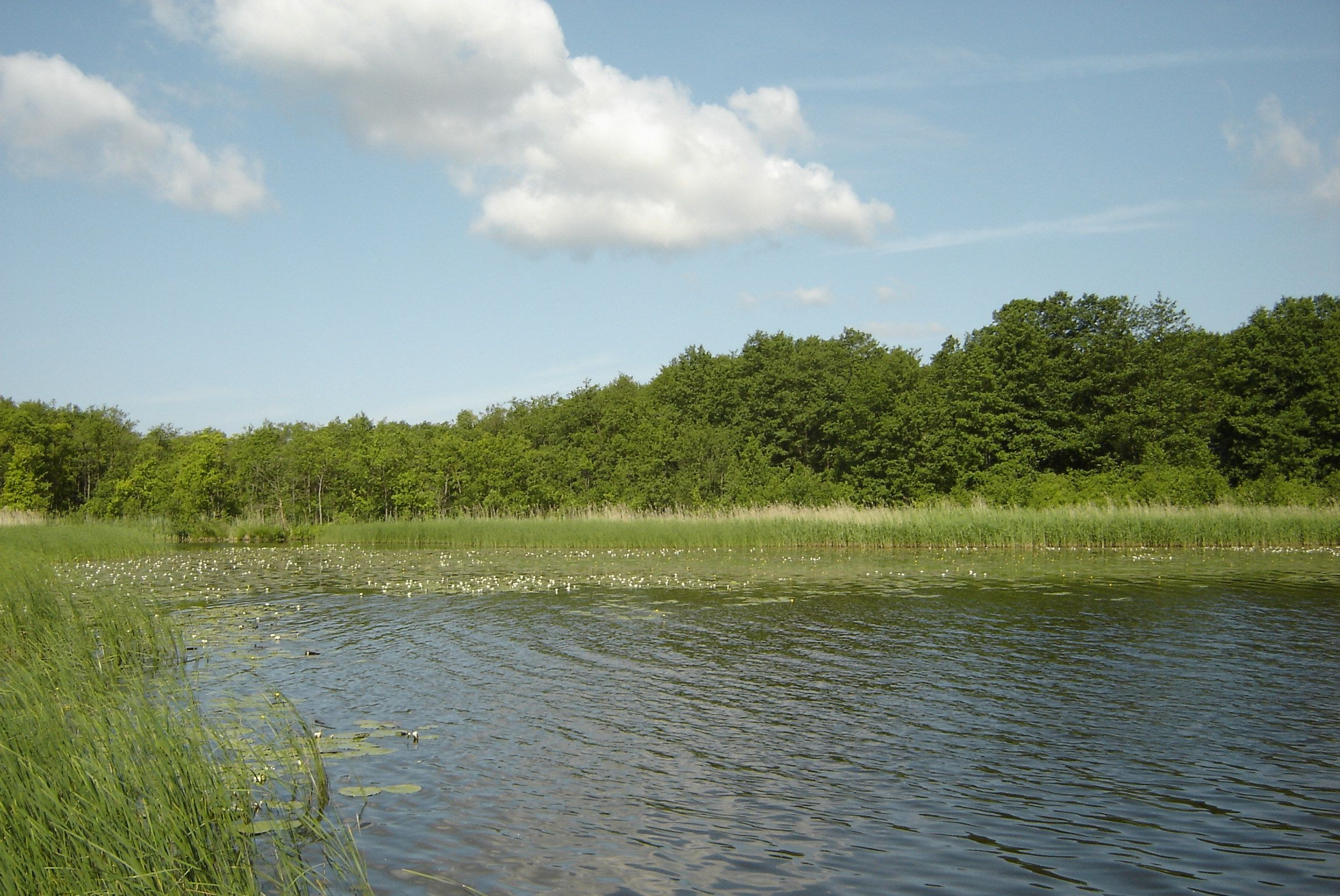

- Location within Mecklenburg-Vorpommern
- Location: Ludwigslust-Parchim, Mecklenburg-Vorpommern
- Coordinates: 53°43′16″N 11°52′31″E
- Primary inflows: Mildenitz, Mildenitzkanal
- Basin countries: Germany
- Surface area: 1.06 km^{2} (0.41 sq mi)
- Surface elevation: 8.6 m (28 ft)

Trenntsee is a lake in the Ludwigslust-Parchim district in Mecklenburg-Vorpommern, Germany. At an elevation of 8.6 m, its surface area is 1.06 km^{2}.
