= Kritzower See =

Lake in Mecklenburg-Vorpommern, Germany

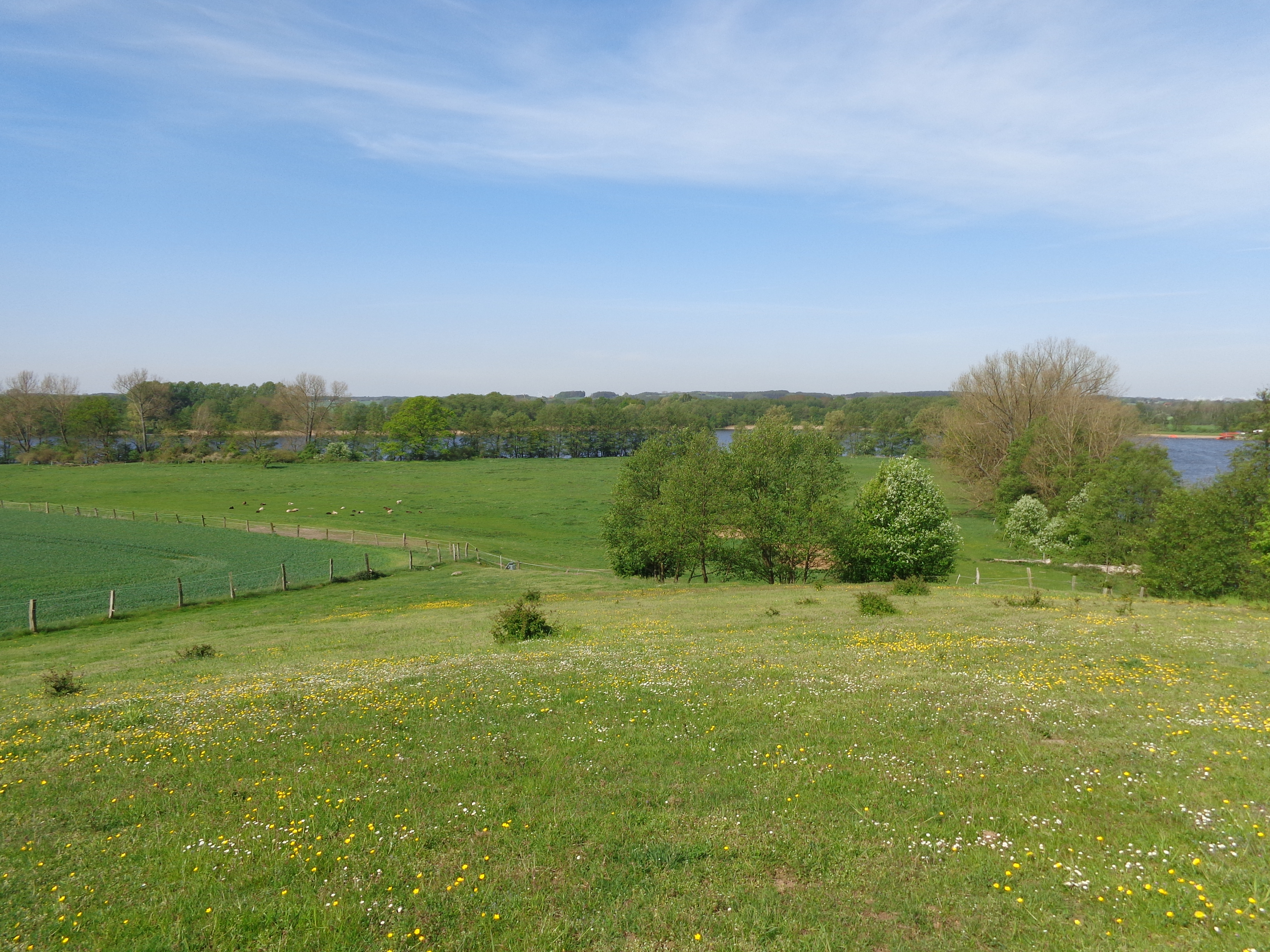
- Kritzower See from the highest point on the east side

- Location within Mecklenburg-Vorpommern
- Location: Ludwigslust-Parchim, Mecklenburg-Vorpommern
- Coordinates: 53°26′58.65″N 12°8′8.16″E
- Basin countries: Germany
- Surface area: 0.63 km^{2} (0.24 sq mi)
- Max. depth: 10 m (33 ft)
- Surface elevation: 60 m (200 ft)

Kritzower See is a lake in the Ludwigslust-Parchim district in Mecklenburg-Vorpommern, Germany. At an elevation of 60 m, its surface area is 0.63 km^{2}.
