= Friedrichsmoorer Karpfenteiche =

Ponds in Mecklenburg-Vorpommern, Germany

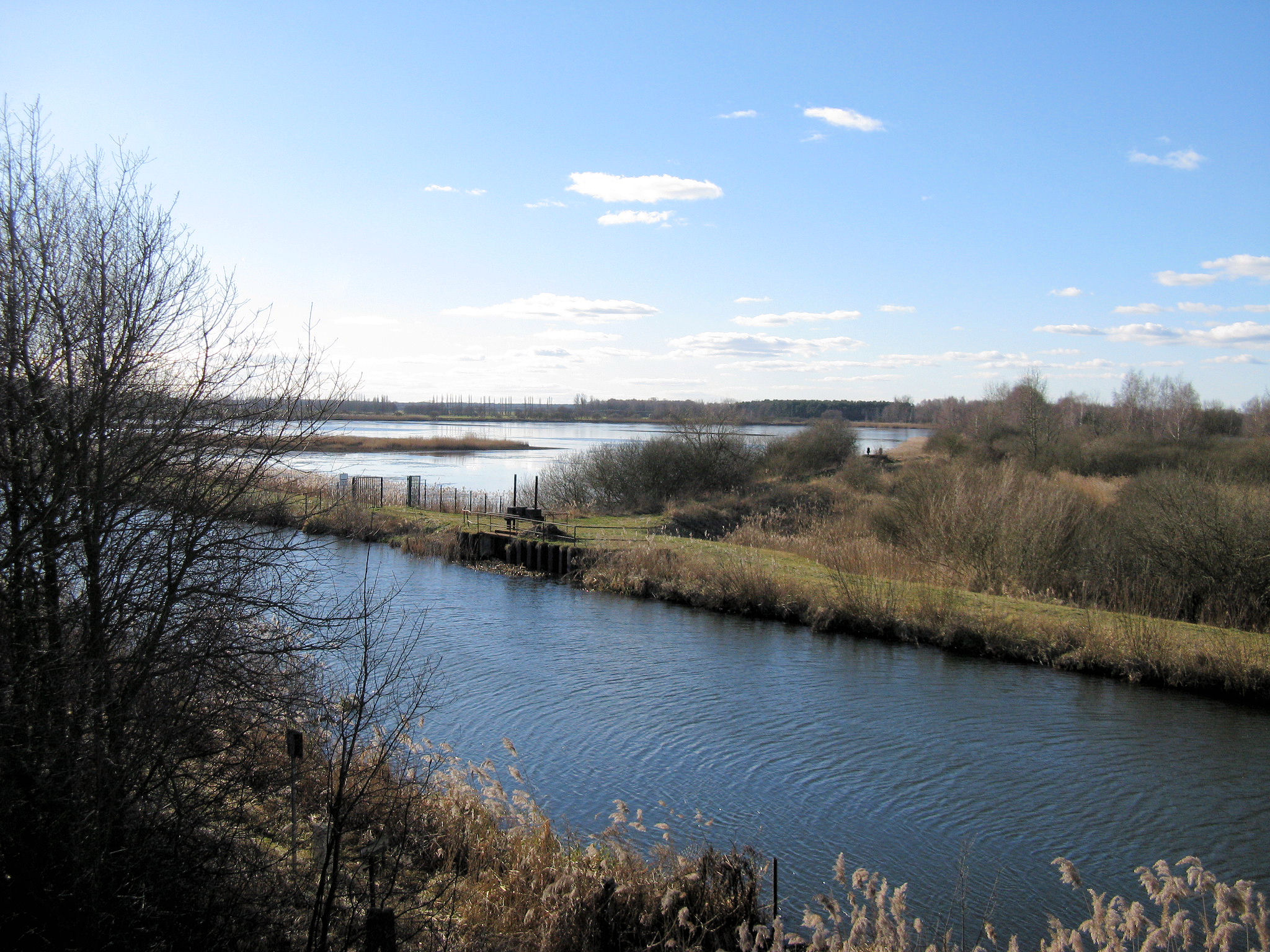

- Location within Mecklenburg-Vorpommern
- Location: Ludwigslust-Parchim, Mecklenburg-Vorpommern
- Coordinates: 53.442202°N 11.615877°E
- Basin countries: Germany
- Max. length: 3.8 km (2.4 mi)
- Max. width: 1.35 km (0.84 mi)
- Surface area: 3.3 km^{2} (1.3 sq mi)

The Friedrichsmoorer Karpfenteiche are ponds in the west of Mecklenburg-Vorpommern, Germany. At an elevation of 35.5–36.9 m, its surface area is 3.3 km².
