= Borkower See =

Lake in Mecklenburg-Vorpommern, Germany

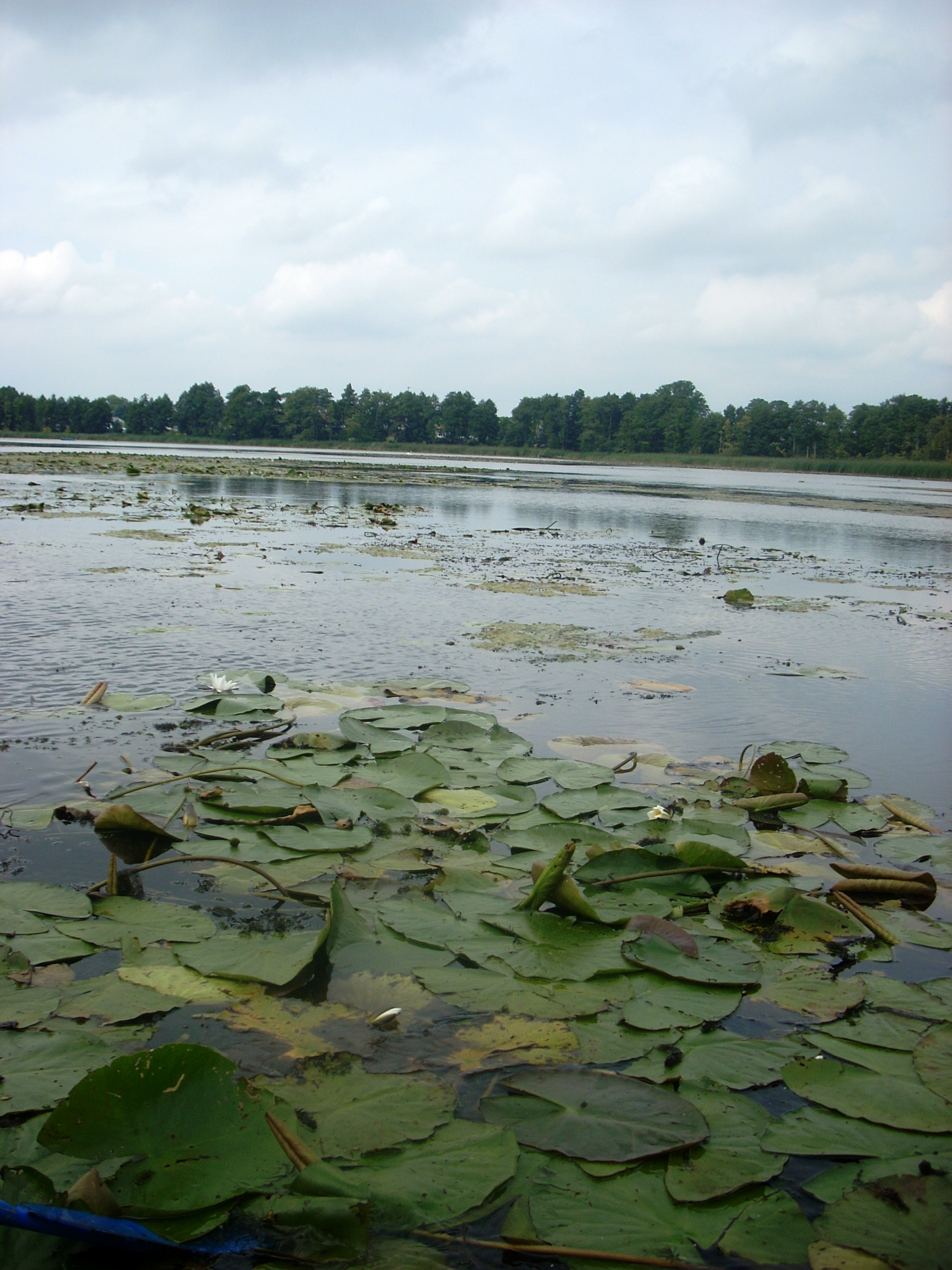

- Location within Mecklenburg-Vorpommern
- Location: Ludwigslust-Parchim, Mecklenburg-Vorpommern
- Coordinates: 53°39′35.64″N 11°57′26.08″E
- Primary inflows: Mildenitz, Schlower Bach
- Primary outflows: Mildenitz
- Basin countries: Germany
- Surface area: 0.196 km^{2} (0.076 sq mi)
- Average depth: 3 m (9.8 ft)
- Max. depth: 10 m (33 ft)
- Surface elevation: 36 m (118 ft)

Borkower See (Lake Borkow) is a lake in the Ludwigslust-Parchim district in Mecklenburg-Vorpommern, Germany. It is located on the edge of the Sternberg Lake District, south of the village of Borkow, within the municipality of the same name. The lake has a surface area of 0.196 km^{2} and lies at an elevation of 36 meters above sea level.

== Geography ==
Borkower See is situated at the edge of the Sternberger Seenland Nature Park within the "Mittleres Mildenitztal" (Middle Mildenitz Valley) protected landscape area. The lake has a wedge-shaped basin, measuring up to 750 meters in width and 370 meters in length, with a broad northern section that tapers toward a narrow southern end. The Schlower Bach stream enters the lake from the west, originating from Kleinpritzer See. The Mildenitz River flows through the lake, entering from the east and exiting to the northwest.

The lake experiences heavy vegetation growth and algae proliferation. A former swimming area near Borkow is no longer in use. With the exception of the northern section, the shoreline is extensively forested and predominantly swampy, characterized by nearly continuous reed beds. The Teichbruch wetland area lies to the west along the Mildenitz. Southwest of the lake, elevations reach 51 meters above sea level at Kavelsberg. A three-kilometer forest educational trail with interpretive signage provides information about the regional ecology, flora, and history. The surrounding forests are dominated by coniferous species. Bundesstraße 192 runs along the northern edge of the lake.

== Ecology ==
Borkower See functions as a river lake, fed and traversed by the Mildenitz River. The lake's shallow depth allows for considerable warming during summer months, which promotes algae growth characteristic of river lake ecosystems. The shoreline supports alder carr woodland, a wetland habitat type commonly found along waterbodies. Black alder (Alnus glutinosa) is the dominant tree species, well-adapted to the high and fluctuating water levels. The herbaceous layer consists primarily of sedges (Carex species), along with yellow flag iris (Iris pseudacorus) and marsh marigold (Caltha palustris).

The lake supports various fish species, including European eel (Anguilla anguilla) and tench (Tinca tinca). Reed warblers (Acrocephalus species) and marsh tits (Poecile palustris) nest in the reed beds along the shore. Eurasian beavers (Castor fiber) inhabit areas upstream along the Mildenitz, while European otters (Lutra lutra) and common kingfishers (Alcedo atthis) are found along the Schlower Bach.
