= Kleinpritzer See =

Lake in Mecklenburg-Vorpommern, Germany

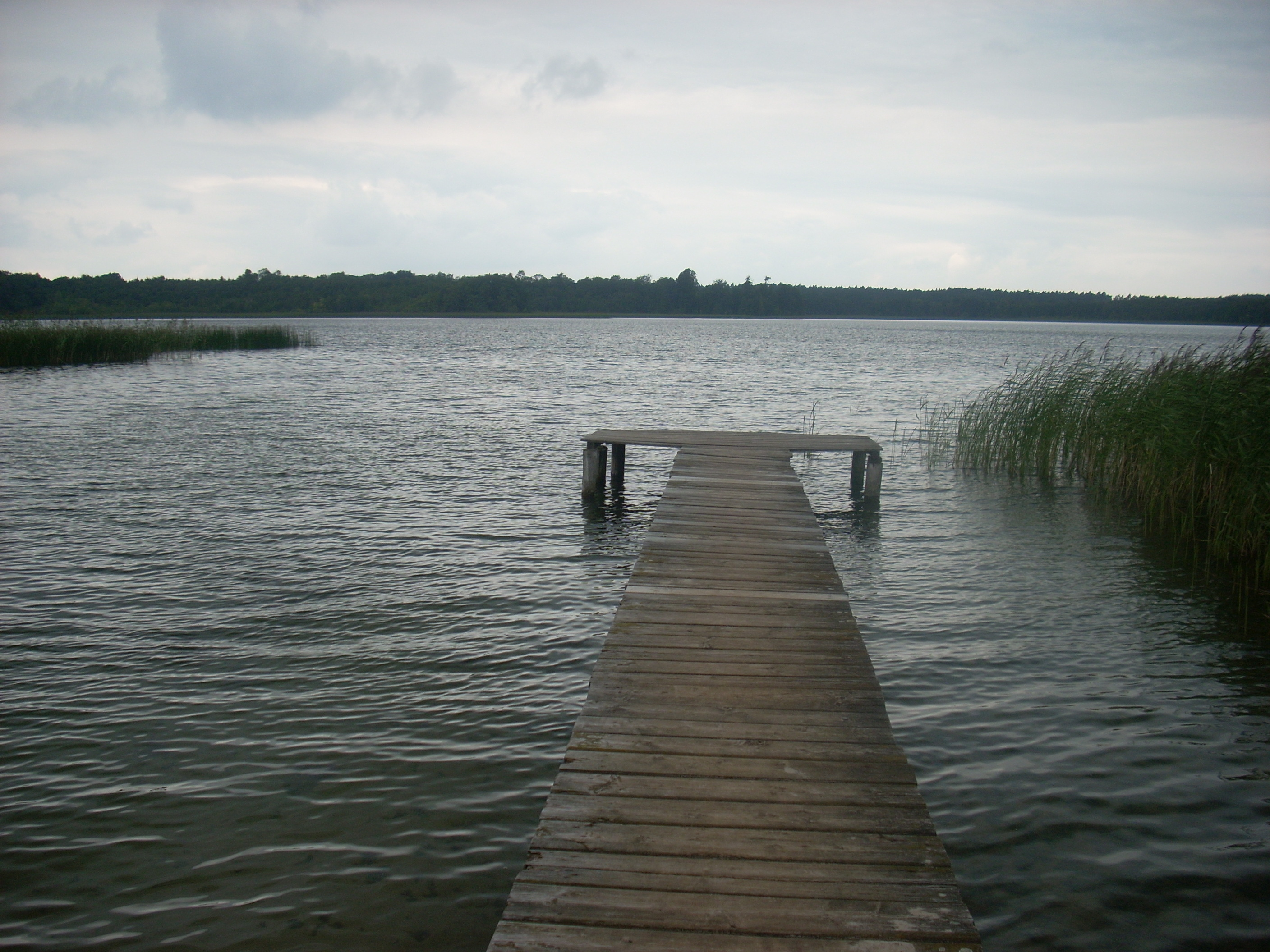

- Location within Mecklenburg-Vorpommern
- Location: Ludwigslust-Parchim, Mecklenburg-Vorpommern
- Coordinates: 53°38′58″N 11°56′27″E
- Primary outflows: Schlower Bach
- Basin countries: Germany
- Surface area: 2.42 km^{2} (0.93 sq mi)
- Average depth: 7.7 m (25 ft)
- Max. depth: 22.3 m (73 ft)
- Surface elevation: 36.6 m (120 ft)

Kleinpritzer See is a lake in Ludwigslust-Parchim, Mecklenburg-Vorpommern, Germany. At an elevation of 36.6 m, its surface area is 2.42 km².
