= Settiner See =

Lake in Mecklenburg-Vorpommern, Germany

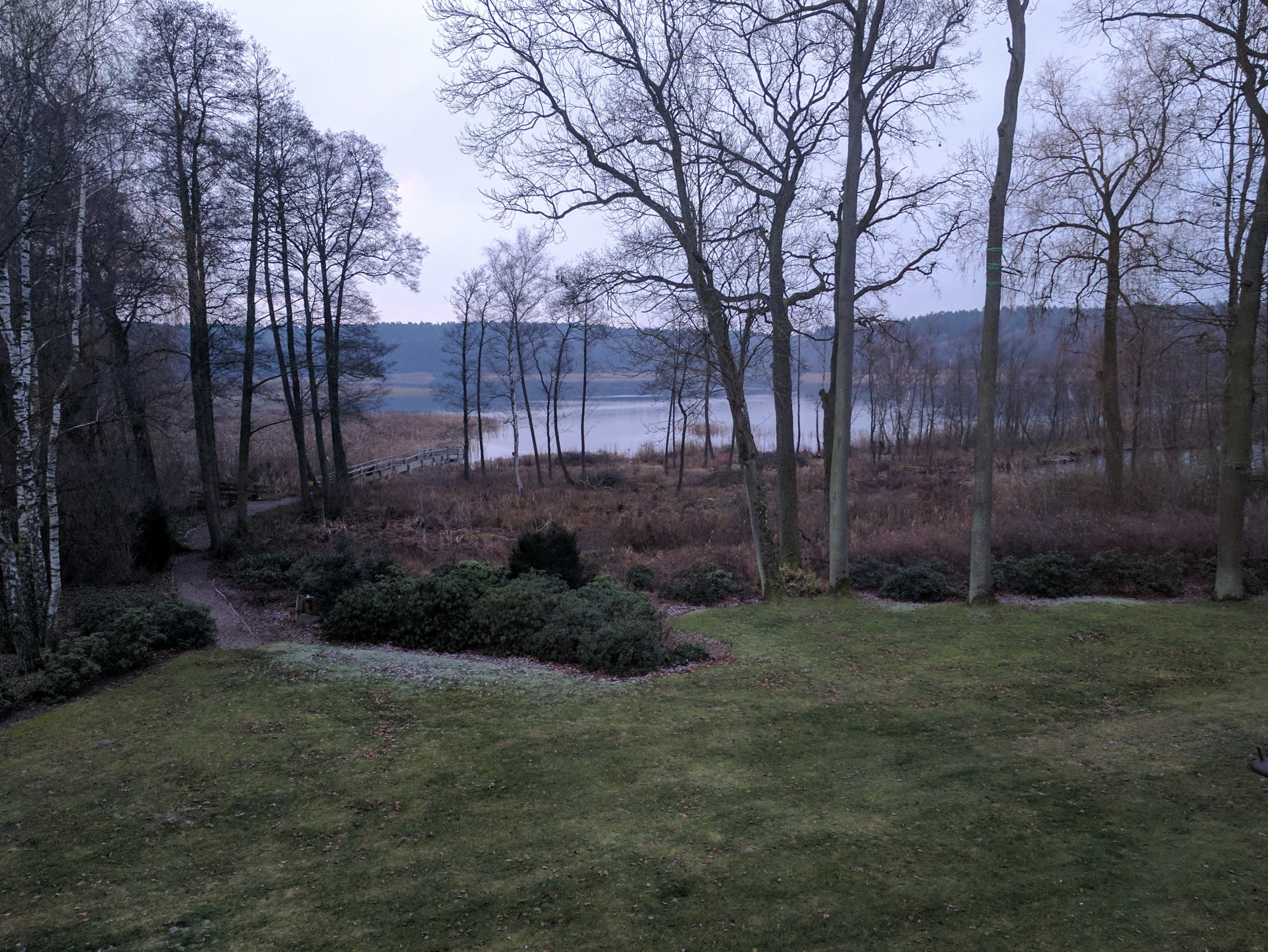

- Location within Mecklenburg-Vorpommern
- Location: Ludwigslust-Parchim, Mecklenburg-Vorpommern
- Coordinates: 53°32′28.78″N 11°37′8.04″E
- Primary outflows: Amtsgraben
- Basin countries: Germany
- Surface area: 0.5 km^{2} (0.19 sq mi)
- Surface elevation: 42 m (138 ft)

Settiner See is a lake in the Ludwigslust-Parchim district in Mecklenburg-Vorpommern, Germany. At an elevation of 42 m, its surface area is 0.5 km^{2}.
