= Kraaker Kiessee =

Lake in Germany

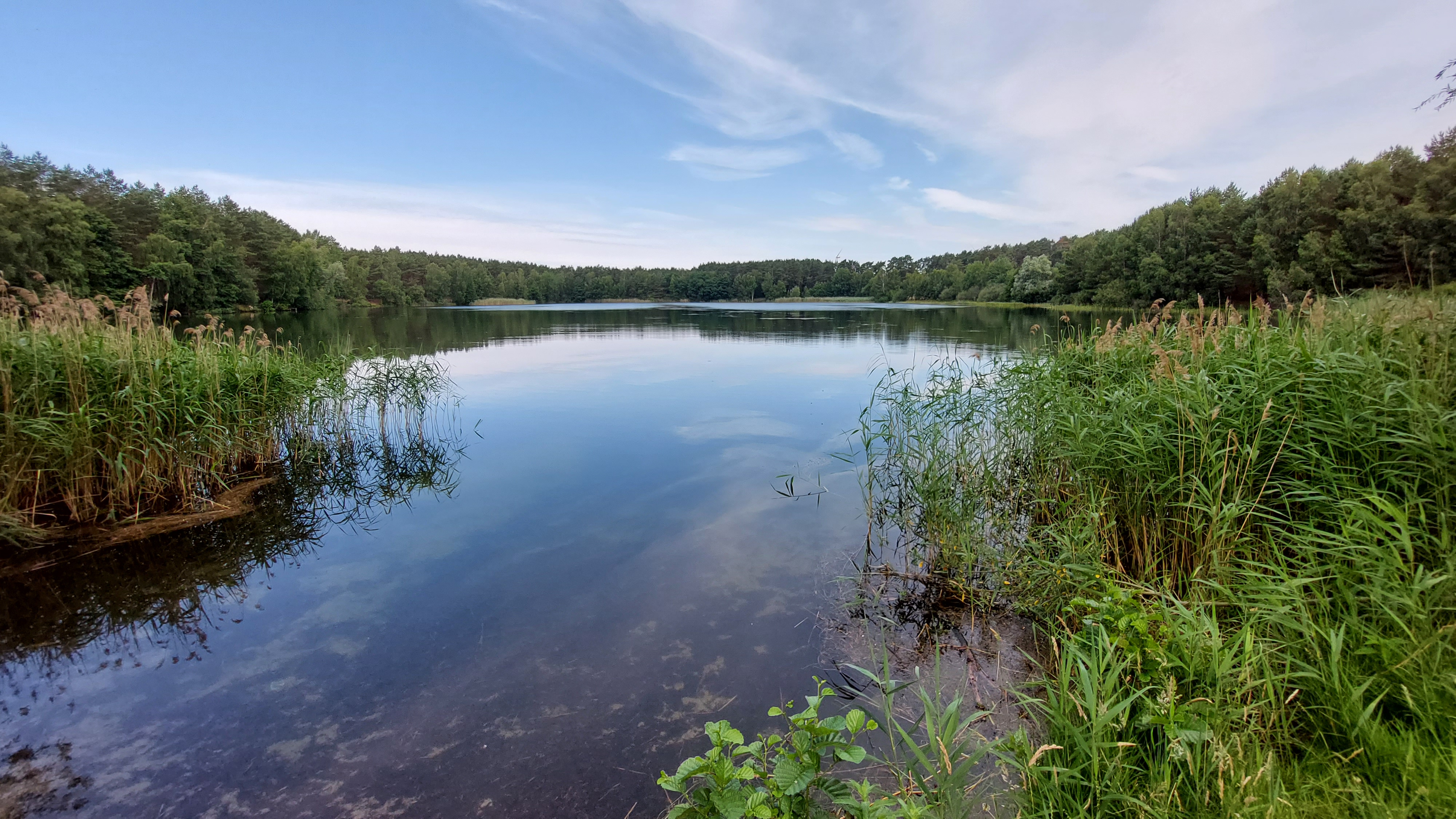
- View of the east side of Kraaker Kiessee Lake, Germany, 2022

- Location within Mecklenburg-Vorpommern
- Location: Ludwigslust-Parchim, Mecklenburg-Vorpommern
- Coordinates: 53.44725°N 11.37315°E
- Primary inflows: none
- Primary outflows: none
- Basin countries: Germany
- Max. length: 0.354 km (0.220 mi)
- Max. width: 0.218 km (0.135 mi)
- Surface area: 0.068 km^{2} (0.026 sq mi)
- Shore length^{1}: 1.04 km (0.65 mi)
- Surface elevation: 32.4 m (106 ft)
- ^{1} Shore length is not a well-defined measure.

Kraaker Kiessee is a lake in the Ludwigslust-Parchim district in Mecklenburg-Vorpommern, Germany. At an elevation of 32.4 m, its surface area is 0.068 km².
