= Kiessee Dreenkrögen =

Lake in Germany

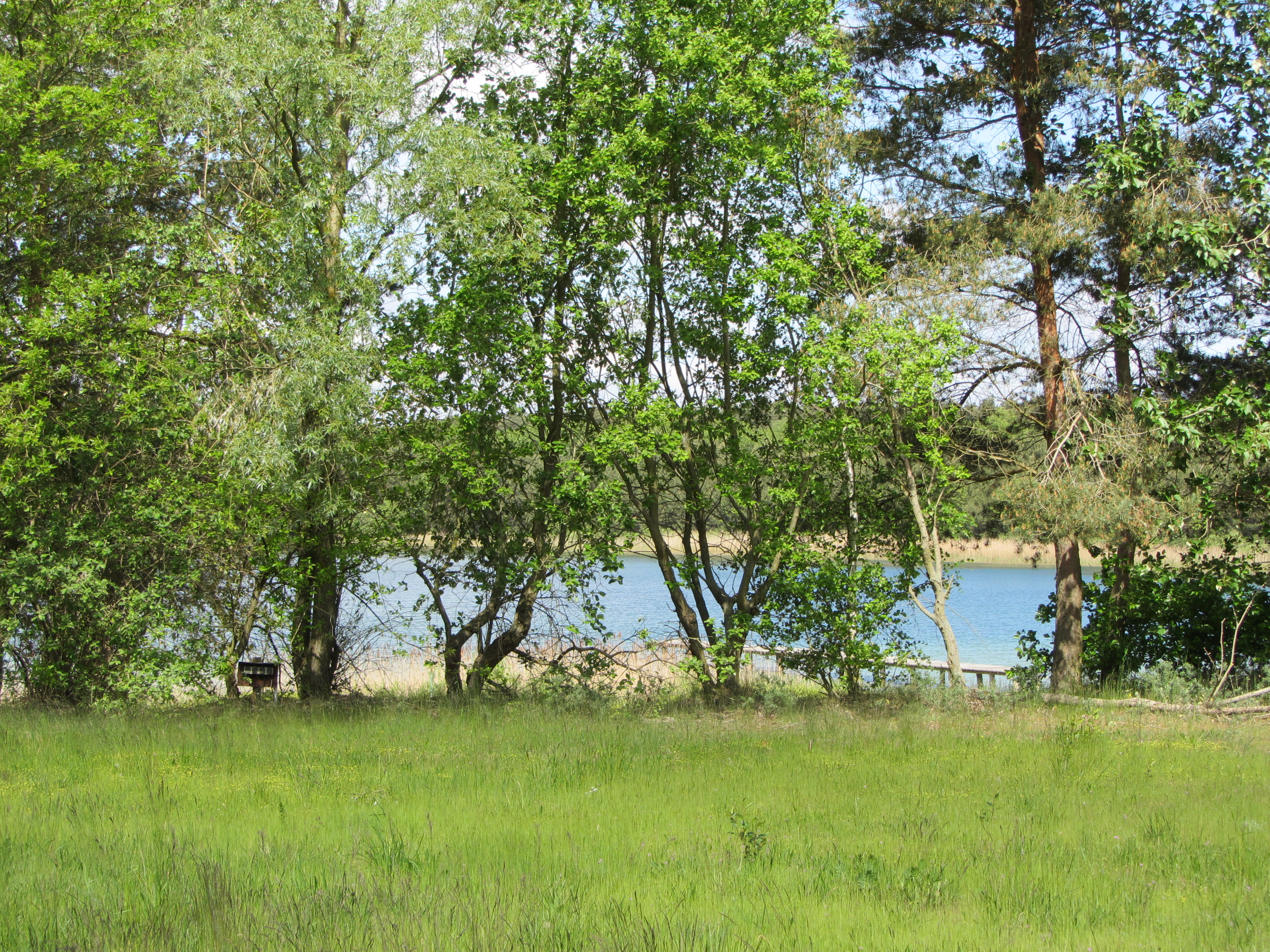

- Location within Mecklenburg-Vorpommern
- Location: Ludwigslust-Parchim, Mecklenburg-Vorpommern
- Coordinates: 53.42655°N 11.50548°E
- Basin countries: Germany
- Surface area: 0.068 km^{2} (0.026 sq mi)
- Shore length^{1}: 1.2 km (0.75 mi)
- Surface elevation: 35 m (115 ft)
- ^{1} Shore length is not a well-defined measure.

Kiessee Dreenkrögen is a lake in the Ludwigslust-Parchim district in the county of Mecklenburg-Vorpommern, Germany. At an elevation of 35 m (115 ft), its surface area is 0.068 km^{2} (0.026 sq mi).
