= Goldberger See =

Lake in Mecklenburg-Vorpommern, Germany

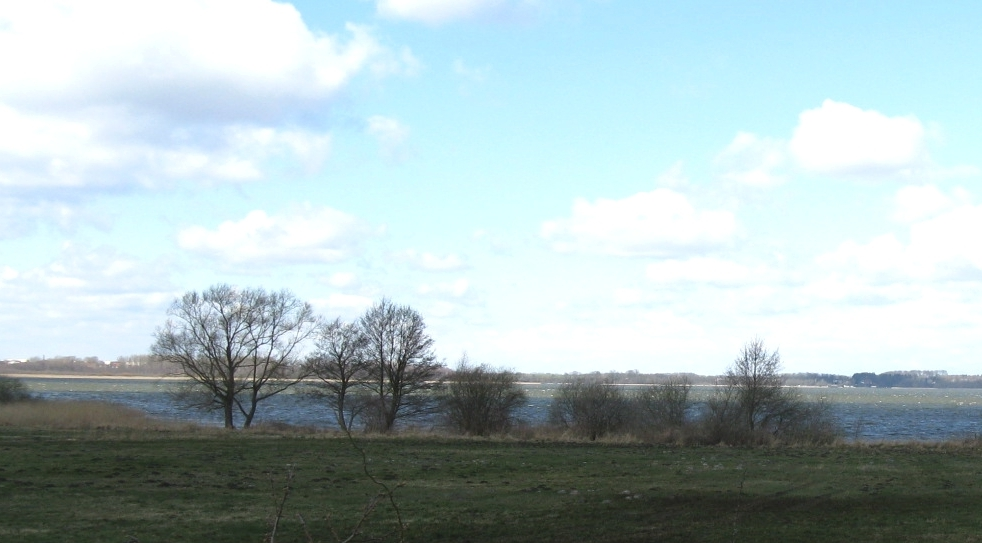

- Location within Mecklenburg-Vorpommern
- Location: Ludwigslust-Parchim, Mecklenburg-Vorpommern
- Coordinates: 53°36′40″N 12°7′30″E
- Primary inflows: Mildenitz, Schwinzer Bach
- Primary outflows: Mildenitz
- Basin countries: Germany
- Max. length: 3.94 km (2.45 mi)
- Max. width: 2.805 km (1.743 mi)
- Surface area: 7.7 km^{2} (3.0 sq mi)
- Average depth: 2.1 m (6 ft 11 in)
- Max. depth: 4.1 m (13 ft)
- Water volume: 16,280,000 m^{3} (575,000,000 cu ft)
- Surface elevation: 46.5 m (153 ft)

Goldberger See is a lake in Ludwigslust-Parchim, Mecklenburg-Vorpommern, Germany. At an elevation of 46.5 m, its surface area is 7.7 km².
