= Luckower See =

Lake in Germany

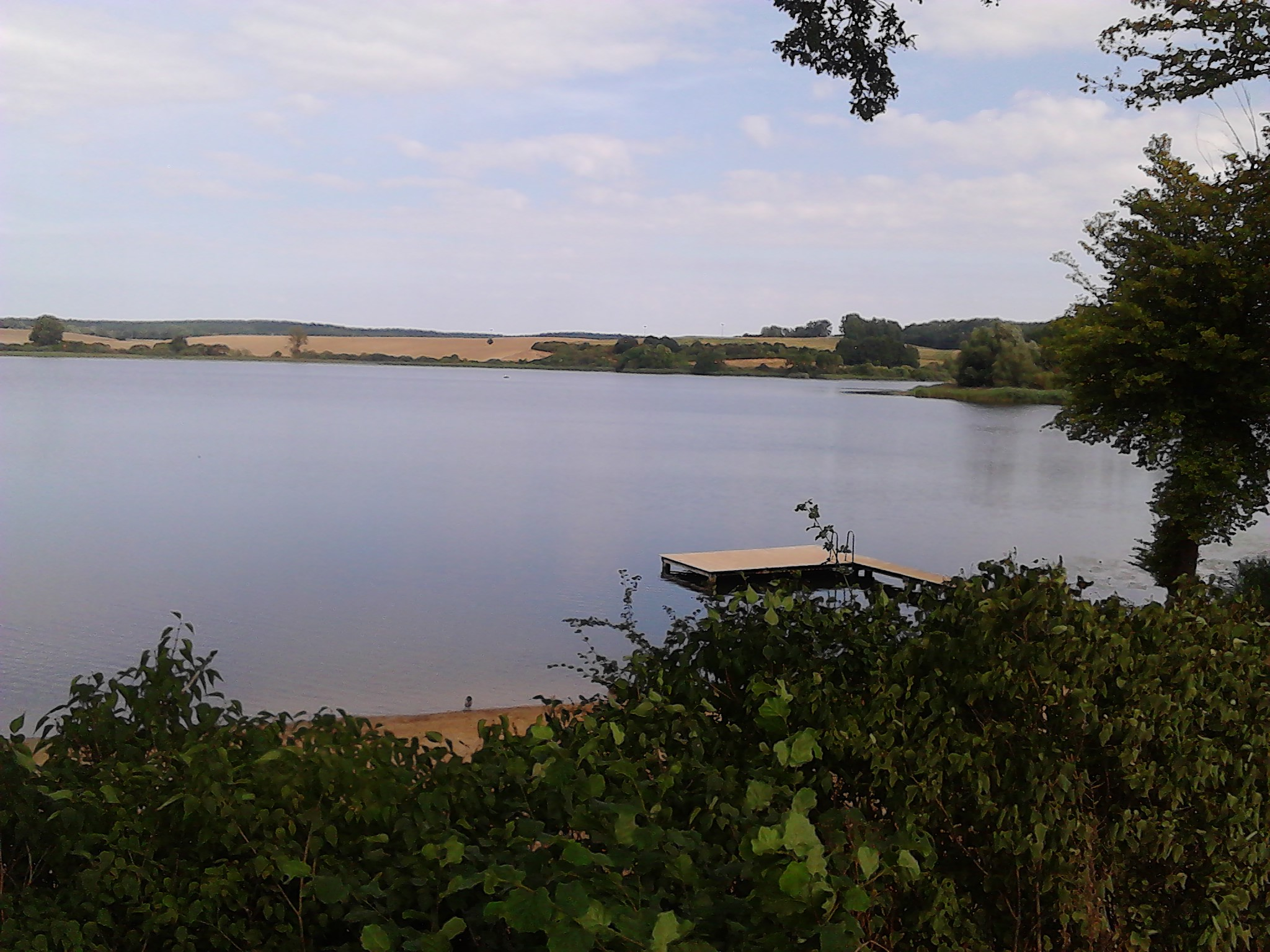
- Luckower See near Sternberg

- Location within Mecklenburg-Vorpommern
- Location: Ludwigslust-Parchim, Mecklenburg-Vorpommern
- Coordinates: 53°43′0.94″N 11°48′27.82″E
- Basin countries: Germany
- Surface area: 0.435 km^{2} (0.168 sq mi)
- Average depth: 5 m (16 ft)
- Surface elevation: 9.9 m (32 ft)
- Settlements: Sternberg

Luckower See is a lake in the Ludwigslust-Parchim district in Mecklenburg-Vorpommern, Germany. At an elevation of 9.9 m, its surface area is 0.43 km^{2} and 5 metres deep.
