= Keezer See =

Lake in Germany

- Location within Mecklenburg-Vorpommern
- Location: Ludwigslust-Parchim, Mecklenburg-Vorpommern
- Coordinates: 53°44′9.31″N 11°37′54.39″E
- Basin countries: Germany
- Max. length: 2.99 km (1.86 mi)
- Max. width: 0.65 km (0.40 mi)
- Surface area: 1.17 km^{2} (0.45 sq mi)
- Shore length^{1}: 8.2 km (5.1 mi)
- Surface elevation: 22.6 m (74 ft)
- ^{1} Shore length is not a well-defined measure.

Keezer See is a lake in the Ludwigslust-Parchim district in Mecklenburg-Vorpommern, Germany. At an elevation of 22.6 m, its surface area is 1.17 km².
