= Neustädter See =

Lake in Mecklenburg-Vorpommern, Germany

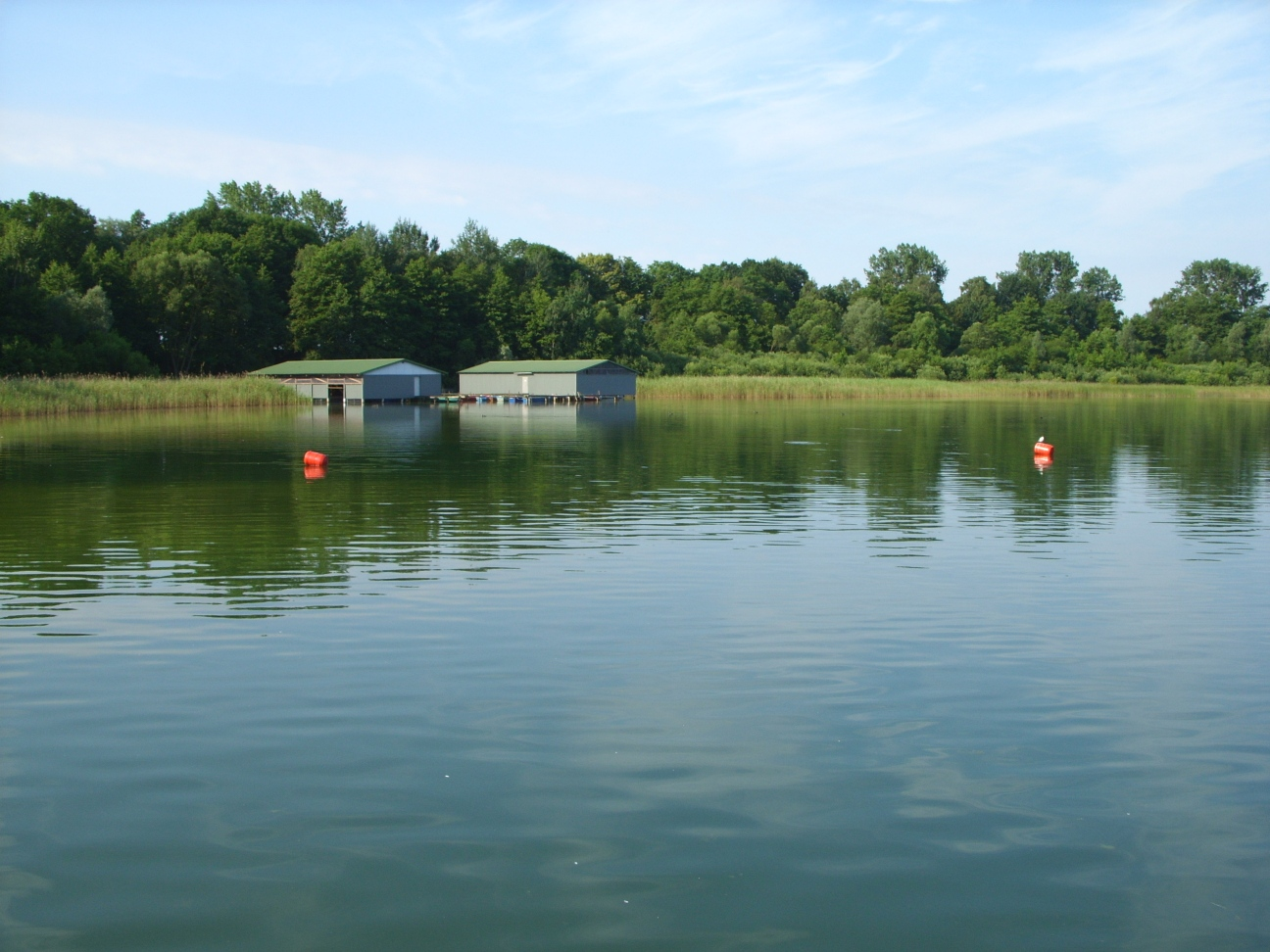

- Location within Mecklenburg-Vorpommern
- Location: Ludwigslust-Parchim, Mecklenburg-Vorpommern
- Coordinates: 53°23′40″N 11°34′01″E
- Basin countries: Germany
- Surface area: 1.29 km^{2} (0.50 sq mi)
- Average depth: 6.9 m (23 ft)
- Max. depth: 31 m (102 ft)
- Water volume: 8,950,000 m^{3} (316,000,000 cu ft)
- Shore length^{1}: 4.8 km (3.0 mi)
- Surface elevation: 33.4 m (110 ft)
- ^{1} Shore length is not a well-defined measure.

Neustädter See is a lake in the Ludwigslust-Parchim district in Mecklenburg-Vorpommern, Germany. At an elevation of 33.4 m, its surface area is 1.29 km².
