= Borkow =

- Municipality
- Location of Borkow within Ludwigslust-Parchim district
- Interactive map of Borkow
- Location within Germany Location within Mecklenburg-Vorpommern
- Coordinates: 53°40′N 11°55′E
- Country: Germany
- State: Mecklenburg-Vorpommern
- District: Ludwigslust-Parchim
- Municipal assoc.: Sternberger Seenlandschaft
- Subdivisions: 6

Government
  - Mayor: Olaf Lorenz

Area
  - Total: 28.11 km^{2} (10.85 sq mi)
- Elevation: 40 m (130 ft)

Population (2025-12-31)
  - Total: 413
  - Density: 14.7/km^{2} (38.1/sq mi)
- Time zone: UTC+01:00 (CET)
  - Summer (DST): UTC+02:00 (CEST)
- Postal codes: 19406
- Dialling codes: 038485
- Vehicle registration: PCH
- Website: amt-ssl.de

Borkow is a municipality in the Ludwigslust-Parchim district, in Mecklenburg-Vorpommern, Germany.
