= Neuhöfer Karpfenteiche =

Lake in Germany

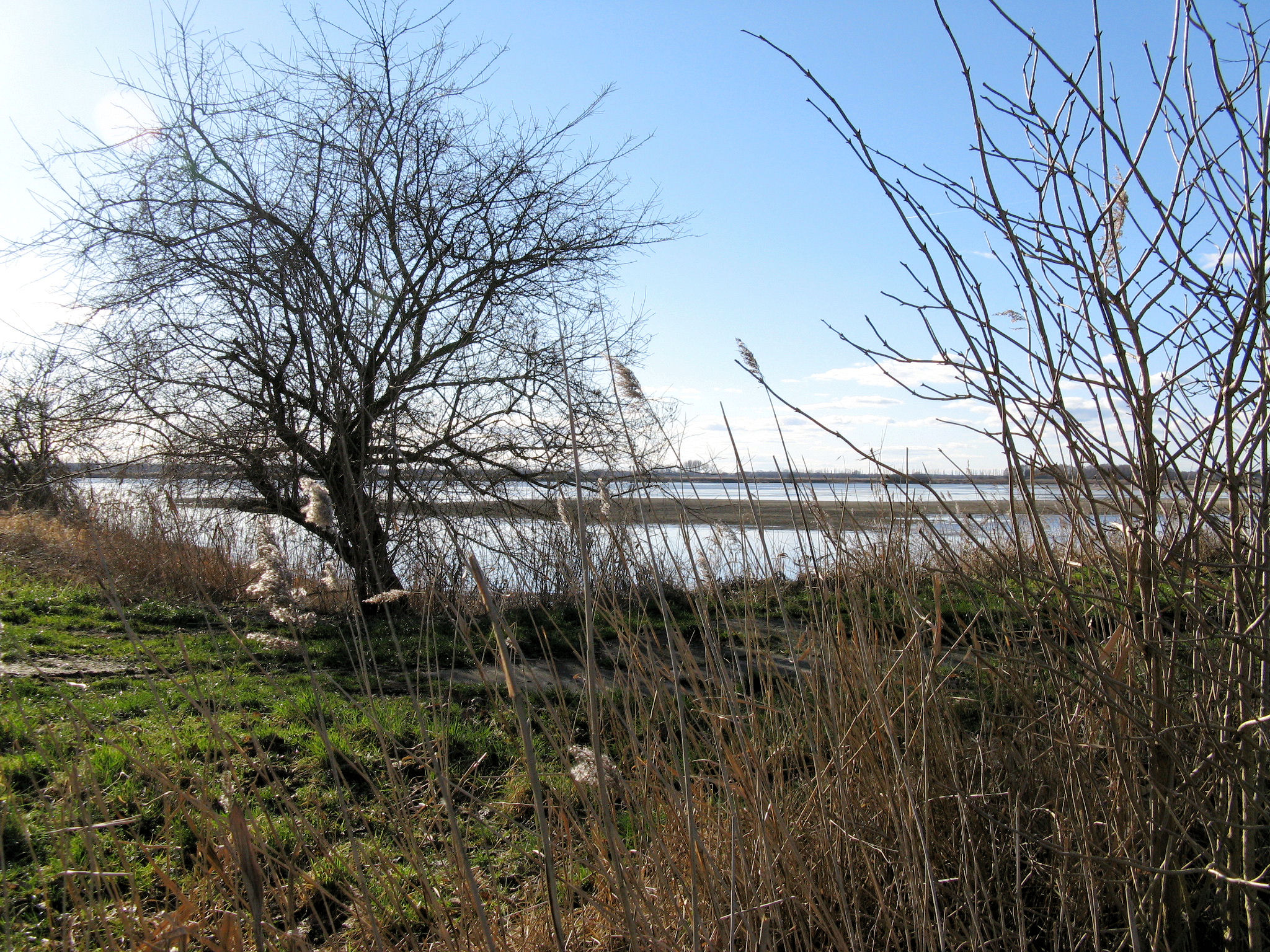

- Location within Mecklenburg-Vorpommern
- Location: Mecklenburg-Vorpommern
- Coordinates: 53.41856°N 11.61269°E
- Basin countries: Germany
- Max. length: 3.6 km (2.2 mi)
- Max. width: 1.45 km (0.90 mi)
- Surface area: 3.6 km^{2} (1.4 sq mi)

The Neuhöfer Karpfenteiche are ponds in the west of Mecklenburg-Vorpommern, Germany. At an elevation of 34.8–35.4 m, its surface area is 3.6 km².
