= Mildenitz =

- Ortsteil of Woldegk
- Interactive map of Mildenitz
- Location within Germany Location within Mecklenburg-Vorpommern
- Coordinates: 53°28.37′N 13°38.47′E
- Country: Germany
- State: Mecklenburg-Vorpommern
- District: Mecklenburgische Seenplatte
- Town: Woldegk

Area
  - Total: 20.32 km^{2} (7.85 sq mi)
- Elevation: 107 m (351 ft)

Population (2013-12-31)
  - Total: 481
  - Density: 23.7/km^{2} (61.3/sq mi)
- Time zone: UTC+01:00 (CET)
  - Summer (DST): UTC+02:00 (CEST)
- Postal codes: 17348
- Dialling codes: 03963, 039753
- Vehicle registration: MST
- Website: www.amt-woldegk.de

Mildenitz is a village and a former municipality in the district Mecklenburgische Seenplatte, in Mecklenburg-Vorpommern, Germany. Since 1 January 2015 it is part of the town Woldegk.
