= Garwitz =

Coordinates: 53.4552°N 11.6972°E

Garwitz is a district of the municipality of Lewitzrand in the Ludwigslust-Parchim district in Mecklenburg-Vorpommern, Germany.

== Geography ==
Garwitz is located about nine kilometers northwest of the district town of Parchim and 24 kilometers southeast of Schwerin on the edge of the Lewitz region. South of the village, the Elde river and an old arm of this river run. The village is surrounded by meadows and farmland to the west and south. To the east, there is a larger forested area. The terrain slopes from approximately 44 meters above NN in the northern part of the built-up area to about 38 meters towards the Elde river.

== History ==
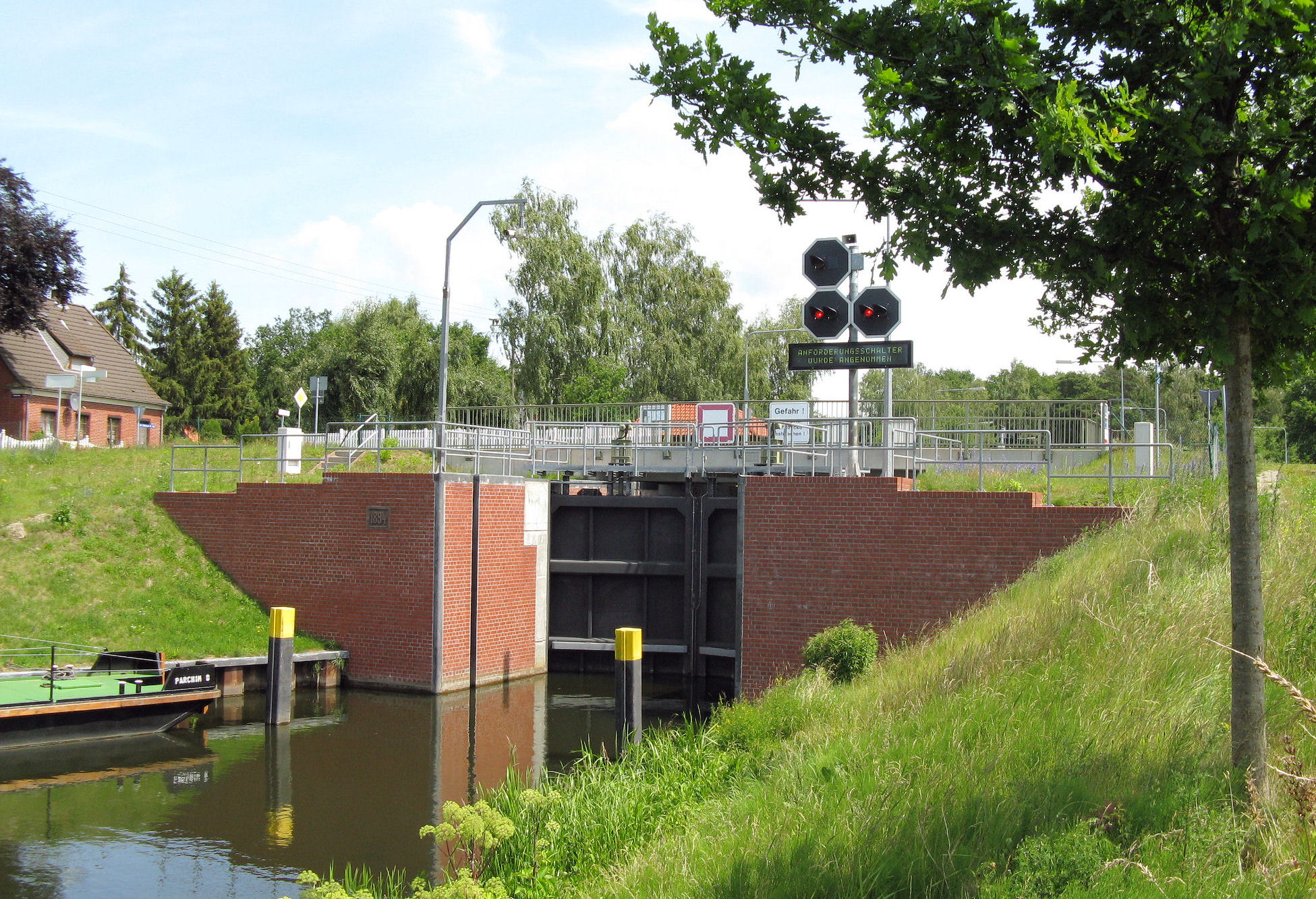
Lock in Garwitz

The first documented mention of the village as Garseviz dates back to 1278. The Gothic church was built in the 14th century. The lock is a structure from 1891 to 1894. The bridge to the neighboring village of Matzlow, dating from 1922, was blown up by German troops on May 4, 1945. A replacement bridge was opened in 1951. Since 1958, land reclamation work in the Lewitz region has significantly influenced the surroundings of the village. The public swimming pool was opened in 1965. In the same year, Matzlow and Garwitz merged to form the municipality of Matzlow-Garwitz.

Simultaneously with the local elections in Mecklenburg-Vorpommern on June 7, 2009, the municipalities of Matzlow-Garwitz, Raduhn, and Klinken merged to form the new municipality of Lewitzrand.

== Sights ==
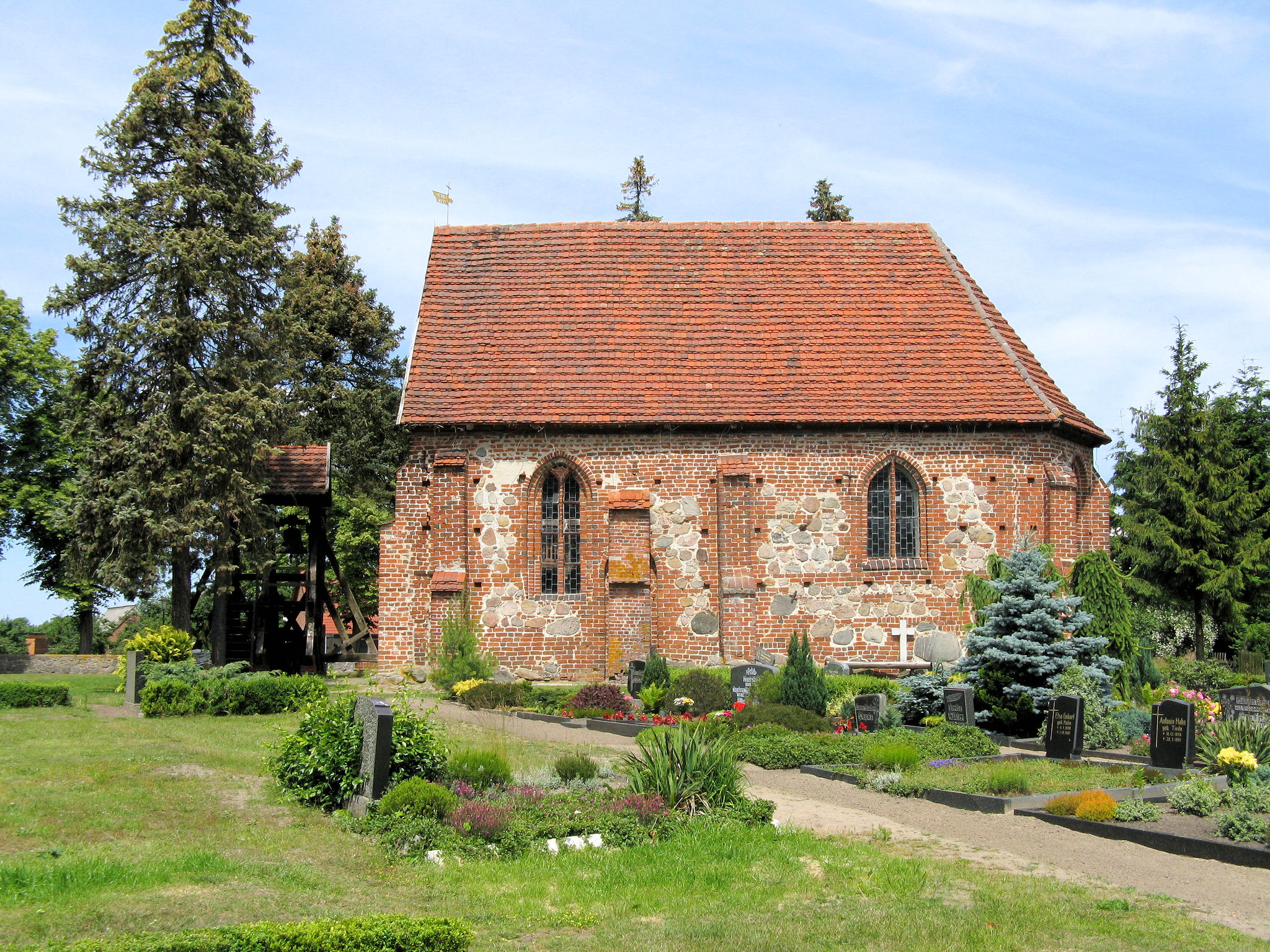
Village church in Garwitz

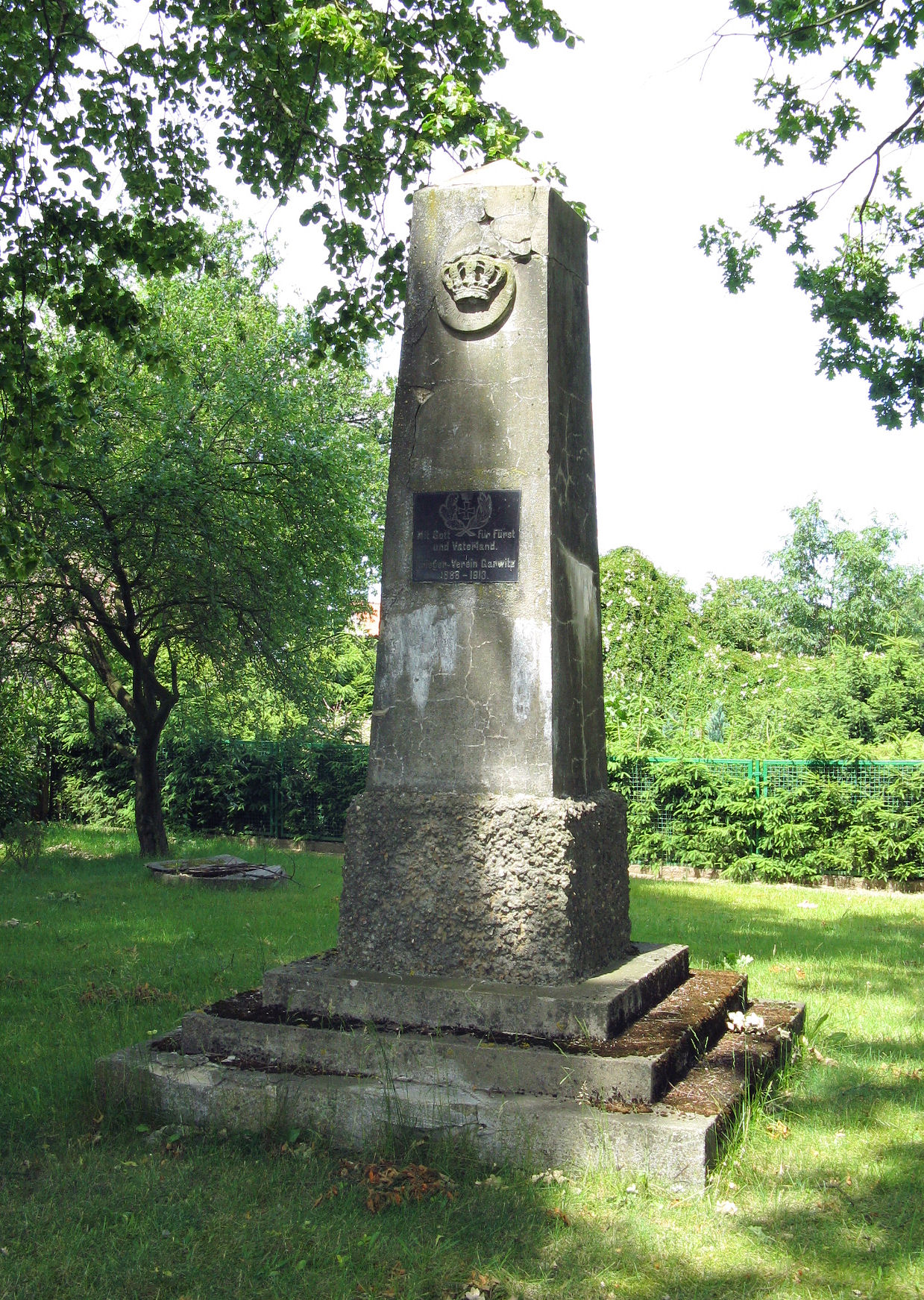
War veterans memorial

The Gothic village church of Garwitz with its three-sided east closure was built in the 15th century as a Church of St. Mary. The free-standing bell frame located west of the church was restored in 1996 and contains two bells from 1453 and 1954. The interior of the church includes an altarpiece in the form of a Gothic winged shrine from the 15th century, which was transferred from Crivitz, an organ loft with carved figures in the railing originating from a former altarpiece, and a chandelier from 1714.

In addition to the church with bell frame and bells, there are several buildings in the Lindenstraße including a farmhouse, two smallholdings, the rectory with barn, stable, and wall, another barn, the war memorial from 1914/18, and the war veterans memorial. The lock is also listed as a historical monument.

== Infrastructure ==
=== Transport ===
The state road L9 runs through Garwitz from Crivitz to Parchim. District road 66 provides a connection to the eastern villages of Alt Damerow and Domsühl. The nearest railway station on the Ludwigslust–Parchim railway line is located in Spornitz. The Bundesautobahn 24 is accessed via the Neustadt-Glewe interchange, which is 13 kilometers away. The Elde lock is frequented by leisure boaters and sports boats during the season.

=== Tourism ===
Close to the lock facility, there is a public swimming pool operated by the municipality, and further east, a holiday settlement. Since 1998/99, there has been a marina with 45 boat berths at the mouth of the old arm of the Elde river.

== See also ==
- Literature about Garwitz in the State bibliography of Mecklenburg-Vorpommern
