= Groß Niendorf, Mecklenburg-Vorpommern =

Groß Niendorf
- Ortsteil of Zölkow
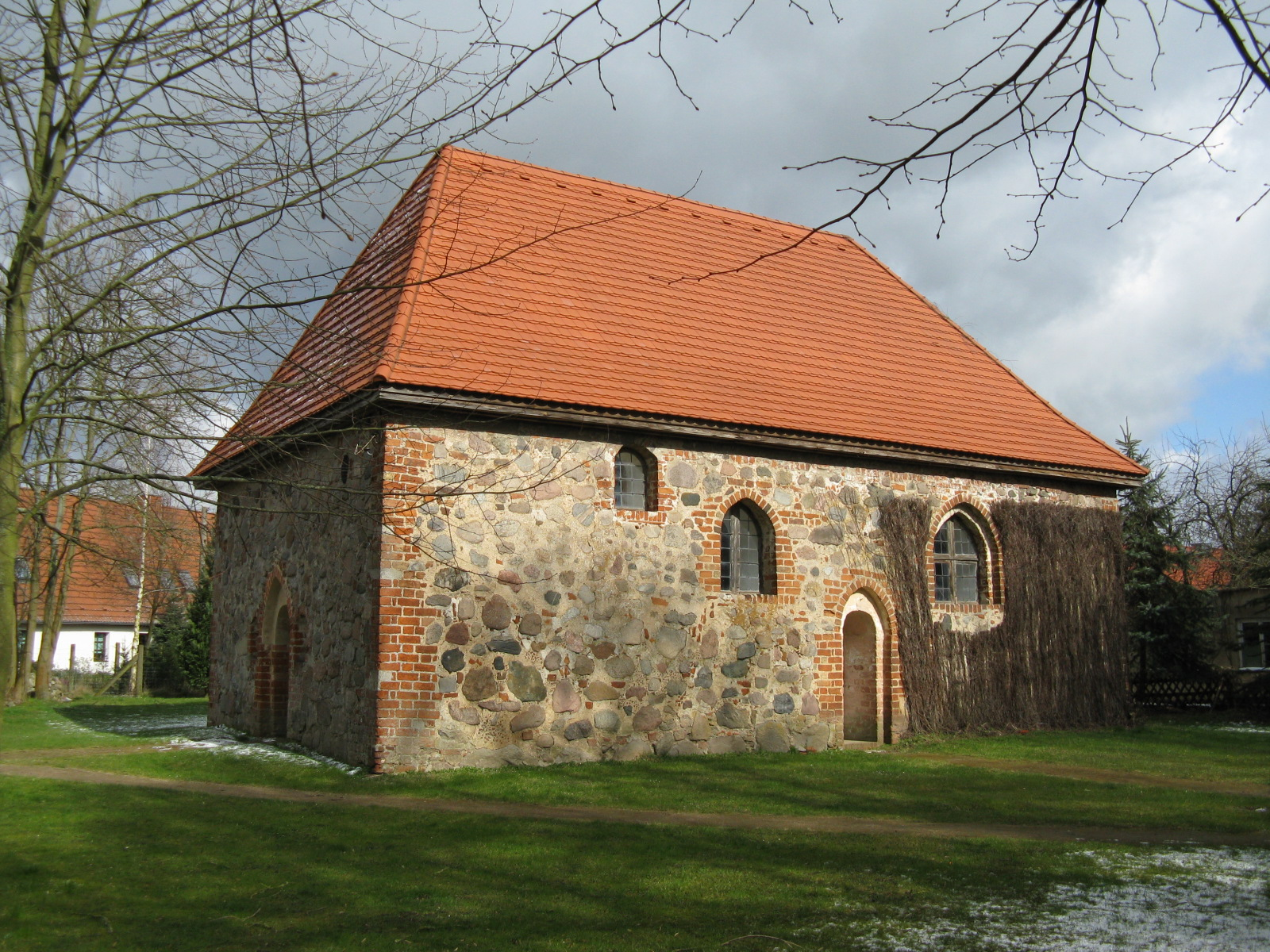
- Church in Groß Niendorf, Germany
- Interactive map of Groß Niendorf
- Location within Germany Location within Mecklenburg-Vorpommern
- Coordinates: 53°35′25″N 11°51′10″E
- Country: Germany
- State: Mecklenburg-Vorpommern
- District: Ludwigslust-Parchim
- Municipality: Zölkow

Area
  - Total: 15.76 km^{2} (6.08 sq mi)
- Elevation: 58 m (190 ft)

Population (2010-12-31)
  - Total: 229
  - Density: 14.5/km^{2} (37.6/sq mi)
- Time zone: UTC+01:00 (CET)
  - Summer (DST): UTC+02:00 (CEST)
- Postal codes: 19374
- Dialling codes: 038723
- Vehicle registration: PCH

Groß Niendorf is a village and a former municipality in the Ludwigslust-Parchim district, in Mecklenburg-Vorpommern, Germany. Since 1 January 2012, it is part of the municipality Zölkow.
