= Severin, Germany =

Severin
- Ortsteil of Domsühl
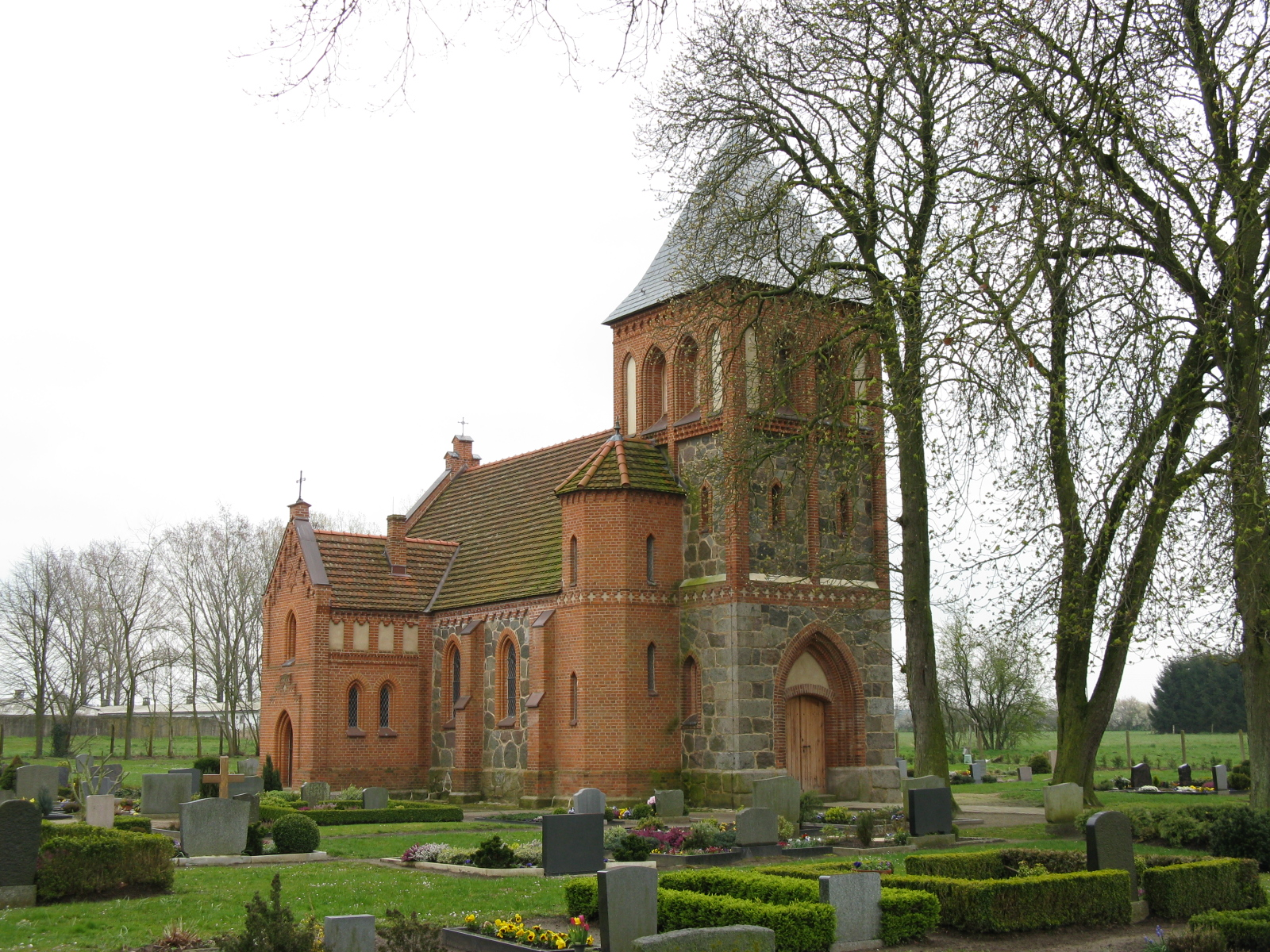
- Church
- Interactive map of Severin
- Location within Germany Location within Mecklenburg-Vorpommern
- Coordinates: 53°22′N 11°48′E
- Country: Germany
- State: Mecklenburg-Vorpommern
- District: Ludwigslust-Parchim
- Municipality: Domsühl

Area
  - Total: 11.16 km^{2} (4.31 sq mi)
- Elevation: 59 m (194 ft)

Population (2012-12-31)
  - Total: 293
  - Density: 26.3/km^{2} (68.0/sq mi)
- Time zone: UTC+01:00 (CET)
  - Summer (DST): UTC+02:00 (CEST)
- Postal codes: 19374
- Dialling codes: 038728
- Vehicle registration: PCH
- Website: www.amt-parchimer-umland.de

Severin is a village and a former municipality in the Ludwigslust-Parchim district, in Mecklenburg-Vorpommern, Germany. It has been part of the municipality Domsühl since 25 May 2014.
