= Jana Müller =

German volleyball player (born 1978)

Personal information
- Full name: Jana Müller Gerisch
- Nationality: German
- Born: May 24, 1978 (age 48); Parchim
- Height: 184 cm (6 ft 0 in)
- Weight: 68 kg (150 lb)
- Spike: 314
- Block: 293
Honours
Women's volleyball
Representing Germany
European Championship
Bronze medal – third place	2003 Ankara	Team competition
FIVB Grand Prix
Bronze medal – third place	2002 Hong Kong	Team competition

Jana Müller Gerisch (born 24 May 1978) is a German volleyball player who played for the German Women's National Team.

She played at the 2002 FIVB Volleyball Women's World Championship in Germany, and at the 2003 Women's European Volleyball Championship. On club level she played with Schweriner SC.

== Career ==
Jana Gerisch grew up in Matzlow at Parchim in, and began her career at SV progress Neustadt-Glewe. In 1990, at the age of twelve, she moved to Schwerin SC and joined the first team in 1997. In addition to various youth and junior titles, she won four German championship titles with the SSC and once the DVV Cup. From 2004, she played successfully for the Dresdner SC in the Bundesliga, with which she again became German champion in 2007. In addition, she won the DVV Cup and the Challenge Cup in 2010 with the DSC. In June 2009, she married Felix Gerisch and adopted his surname. After the 2009/10 season she finished her career.
