= Matzlow =

Coordinates: 53°26′53″N 11°42′14″E

Matzlow is a district of the municipality of Lewitzrand in the Ludwigslust-Parchim district in Mecklenburg-Vorpommern, Germany.

== History ==
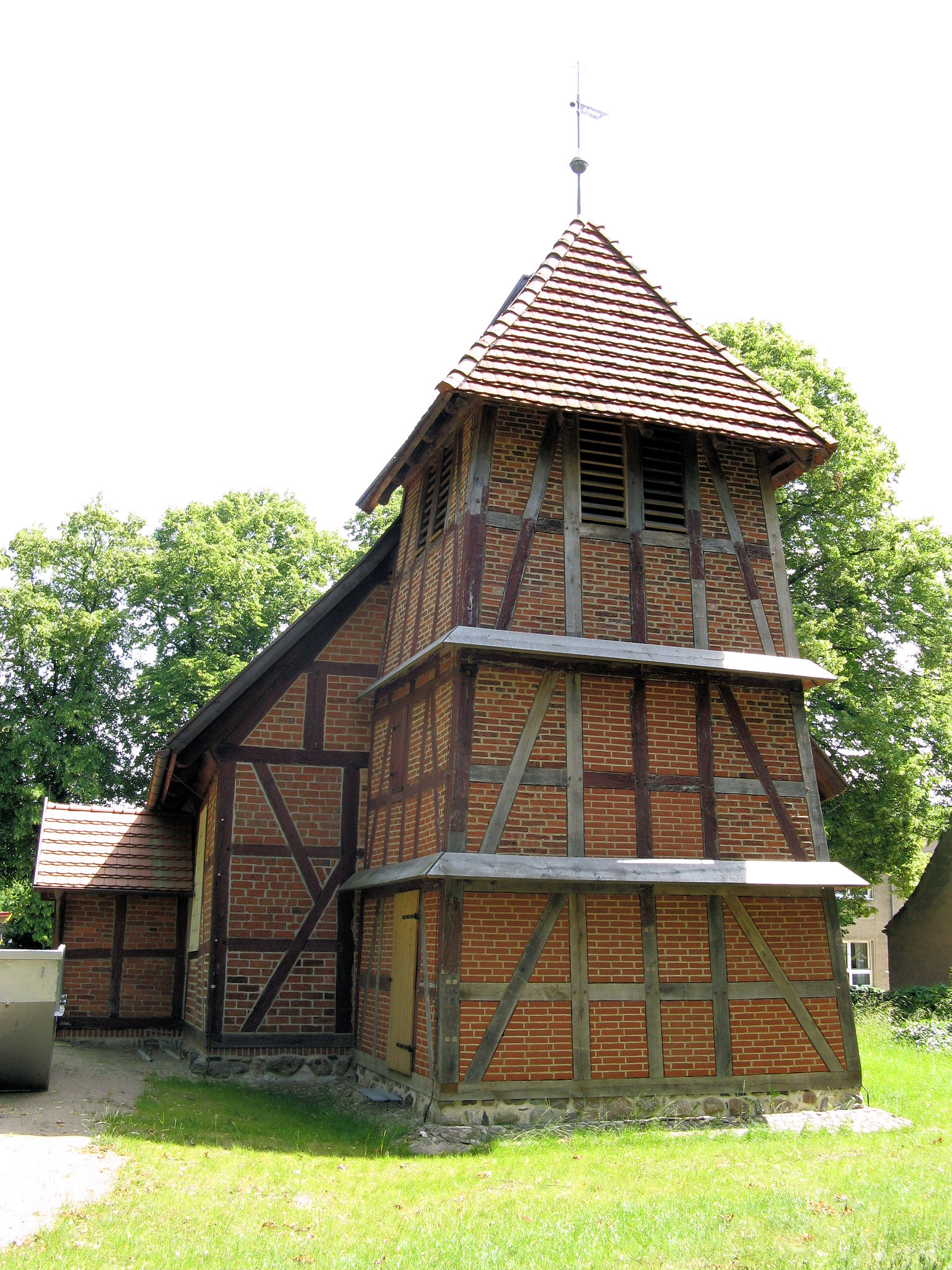
Village church in Matzlow from the east

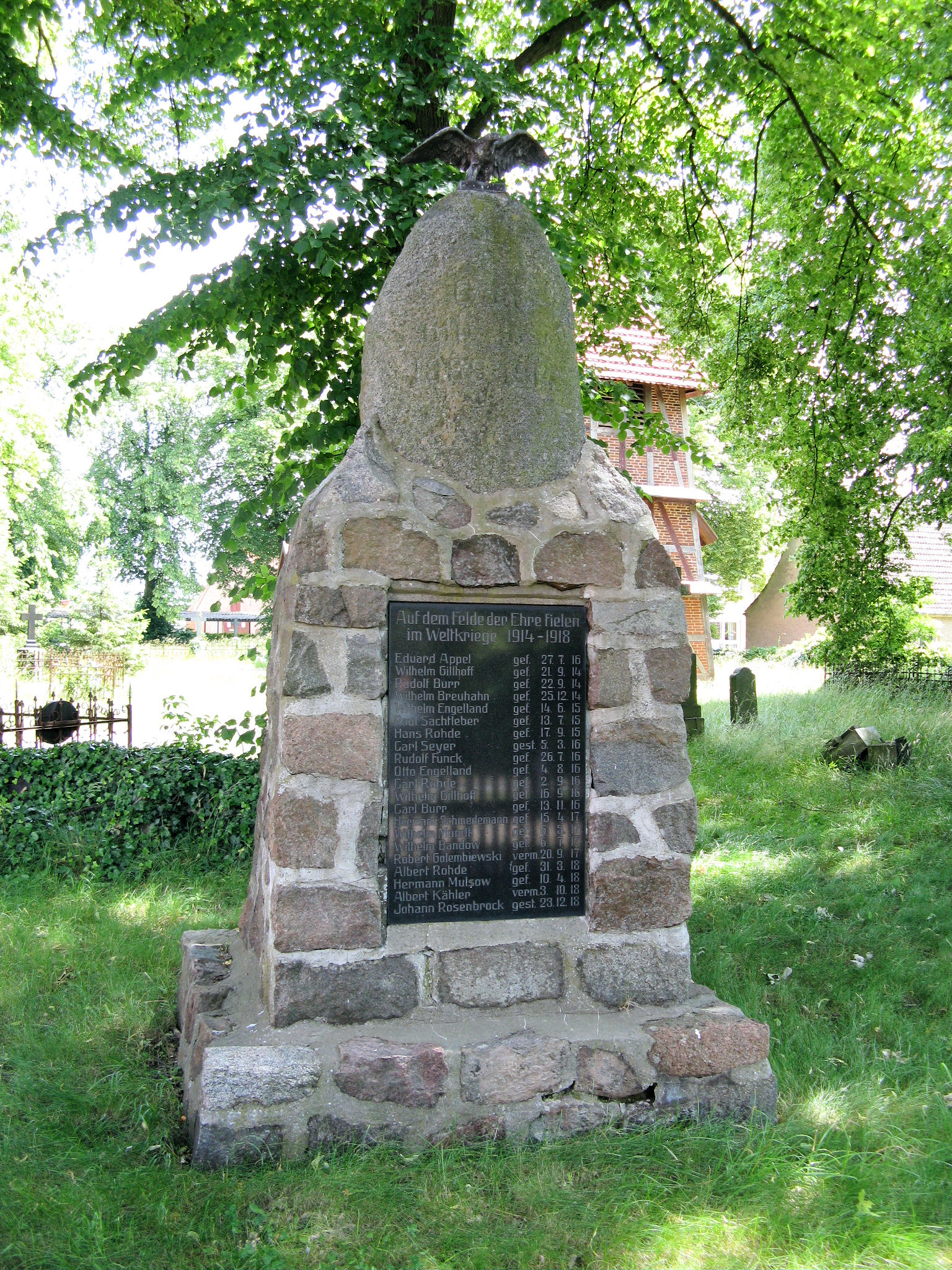
War memorial 1914/18

The first documentary mention of the place dates from the year 1370 as Maslowe. Since 1920, Matzlow was an independent municipality in the Neustadt office. The surroundings of the village were significantly shaped since 1958 by the reclamation work in the Lewitz. In 1965, Matzlow and Garwitz merged to form the municipality of Matzlow-Garwitz.

== Sights ==
=== Village church ===
The current half-timbered church with a three-sided eastern end was consecrated in 1789. The half-timbered tower on the west side dates from 1831 and houses two bells from 1931 and 1961. The interior includes a carved Crucifix with Evangelist symbols from the 15th century, a simple altar, and a Pulpit clock. Carved reliefs and round pictures come from a lay artist from the 1990s. A church also existed in Matzlow before 1789, the first one was destroyed during the Thirty Years' War.

=== Memorial ===
Next to the church are the memorial for the fallen of the First World War in front of the cemetery and the former school on Parchimer Street, both under monument protection.
