= Herzberg, Mecklenburg-Vorpommern =

Herzberg
- Ortsteil of Obere Warnow
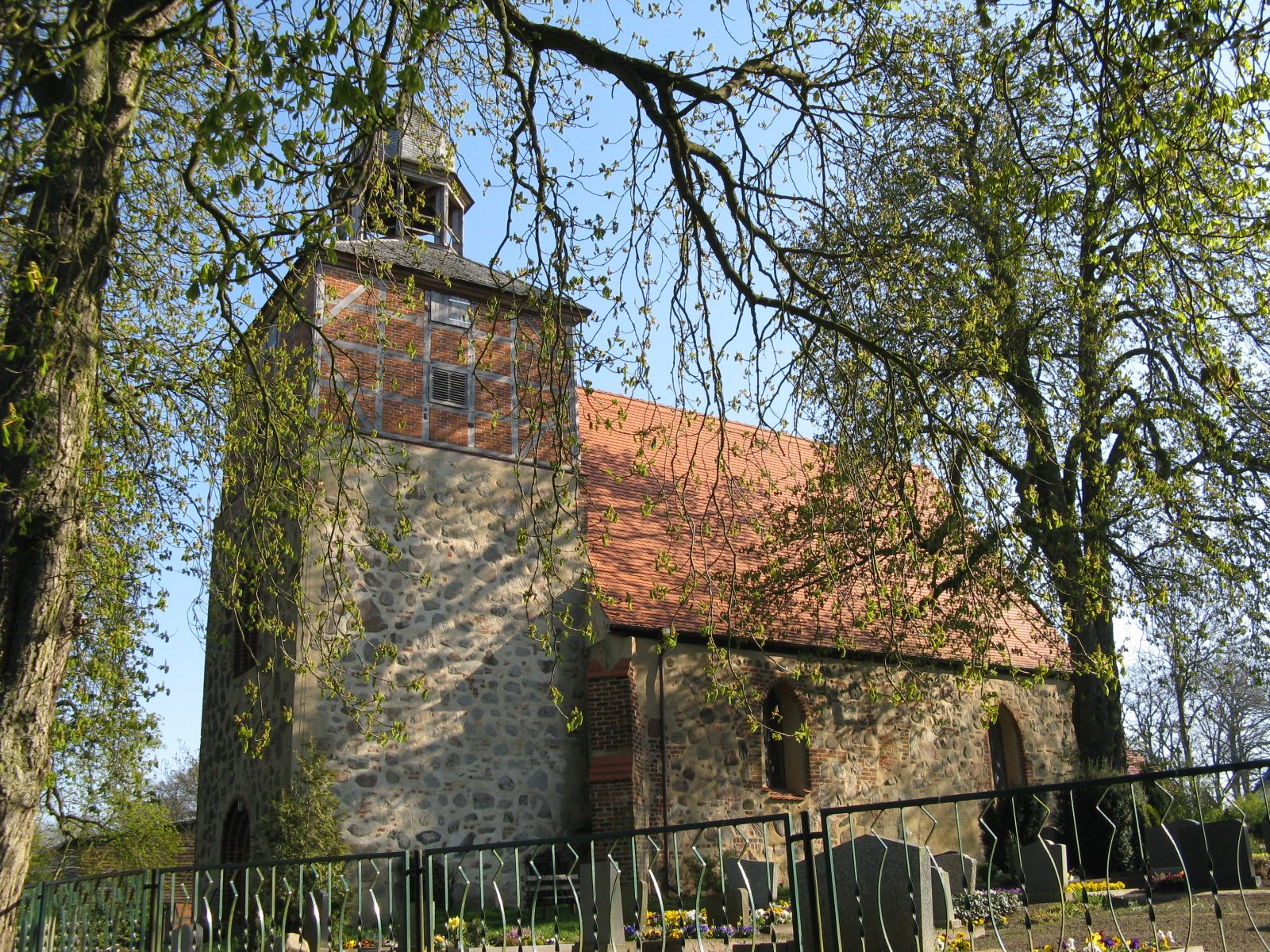
- Church
- Interactive map of Herzberg
- Location within Germany Location within Mecklenburg-Vorpommern
- Coordinates: 53°32′N 11°56′E
- Country: Germany
- State: Mecklenburg-Vorpommern
- District: Ludwigslust-Parchim
- Municipality: Obere Warnow
- Subdivisions: 3 Ortsteile

Area
  - Total: 21.75 km^{2} (8.40 sq mi)
- Elevation: 69 m (226 ft)

Population (2010-12-31)
  - Total: 319
  - Density: 14.7/km^{2} (38.0/sq mi)
- Time zone: UTC+01:00 (CET)
  - Summer (DST): UTC+02:00 (CEST)
- Postal codes: 19374
- Dialling codes: 038720
- Vehicle registration: PCH
- Website: www.amt-eldenburg-luebz.de

Herzberg (German pronunciation: [ˈhɛʁtsˌbɛʁk]) is a village and a former municipality in the Ludwigslust-Parchim district, in Mecklenburg-Vorpommern, Germany. Since 1 January 2012, it is part of the municipality Obere Warnow.
