= Grebbin =

- Ortsteil of Obere Warnow
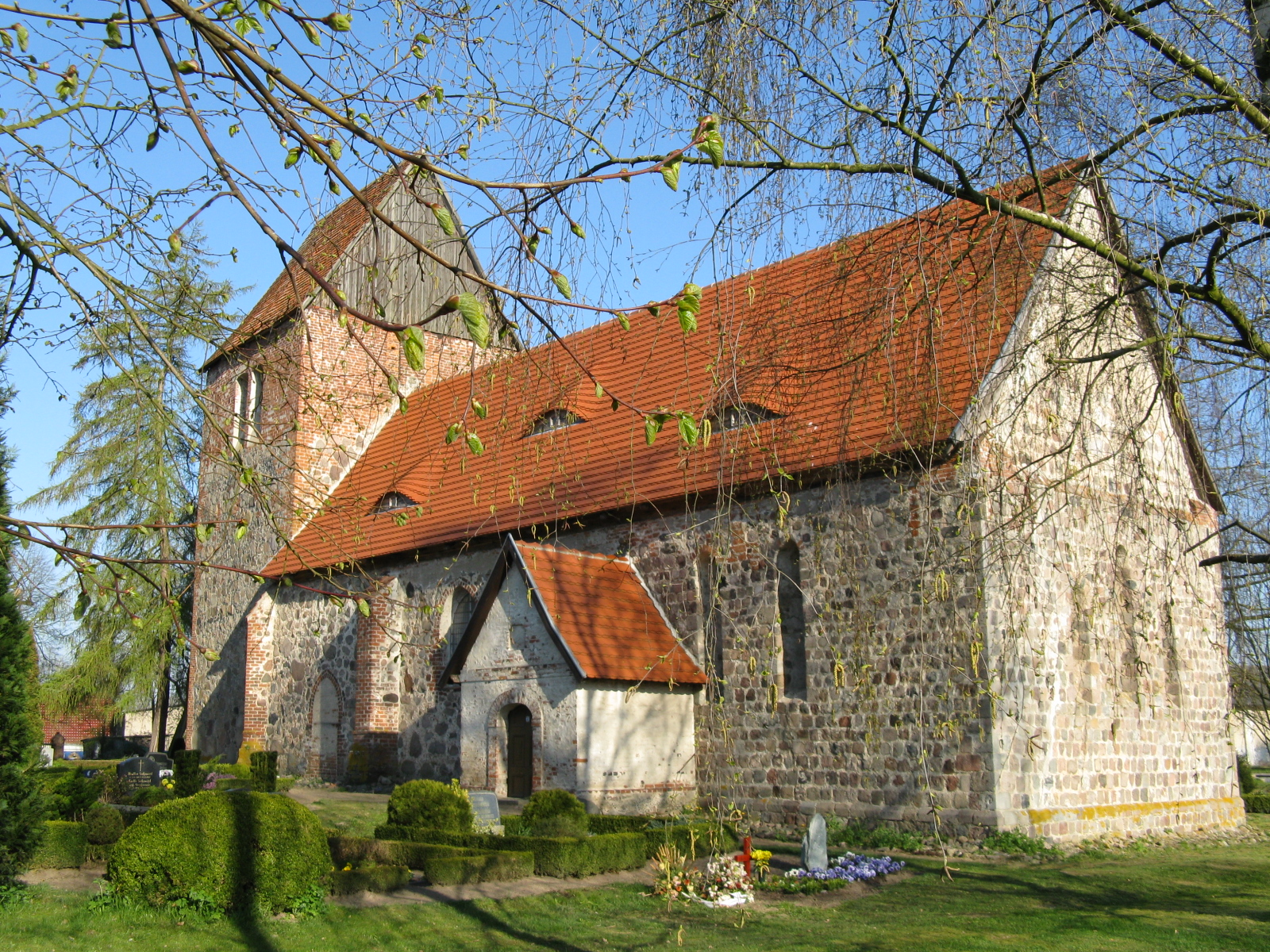
- Church
- Interactive map of Grebbin
- Location within Germany Location within Mecklenburg-Vorpommern
- Coordinates: 53°31′N 11°52′E
- Country: Germany
- State: Mecklenburg-Vorpommern
- District: Ludwigslust-Parchim
- Municipality: Obere Warnow

Area
  - Total: 24.72 km^{2} (9.54 sq mi)
- Elevation: 65 m (213 ft)

Population (2010-12-31)
  - Total: 501
  - Density: 20.3/km^{2} (52.5/sq mi)
- Time zone: UTC+01:00 (CET)
  - Summer (DST): UTC+02:00 (CEST)
- Postal codes: 19374
- Dialling codes: 038720
- Vehicle registration: PCH
- Website: www.amt-parchimer-umland.de

Grebbin is a village and a former municipality in the Ludwigslust-Parchim district, in Mecklenburg-Vorpommern, Germany. Since 1 January 2012, it is part of the municipality Obere Warnow.
