= Ziegendorf =

- Municipality
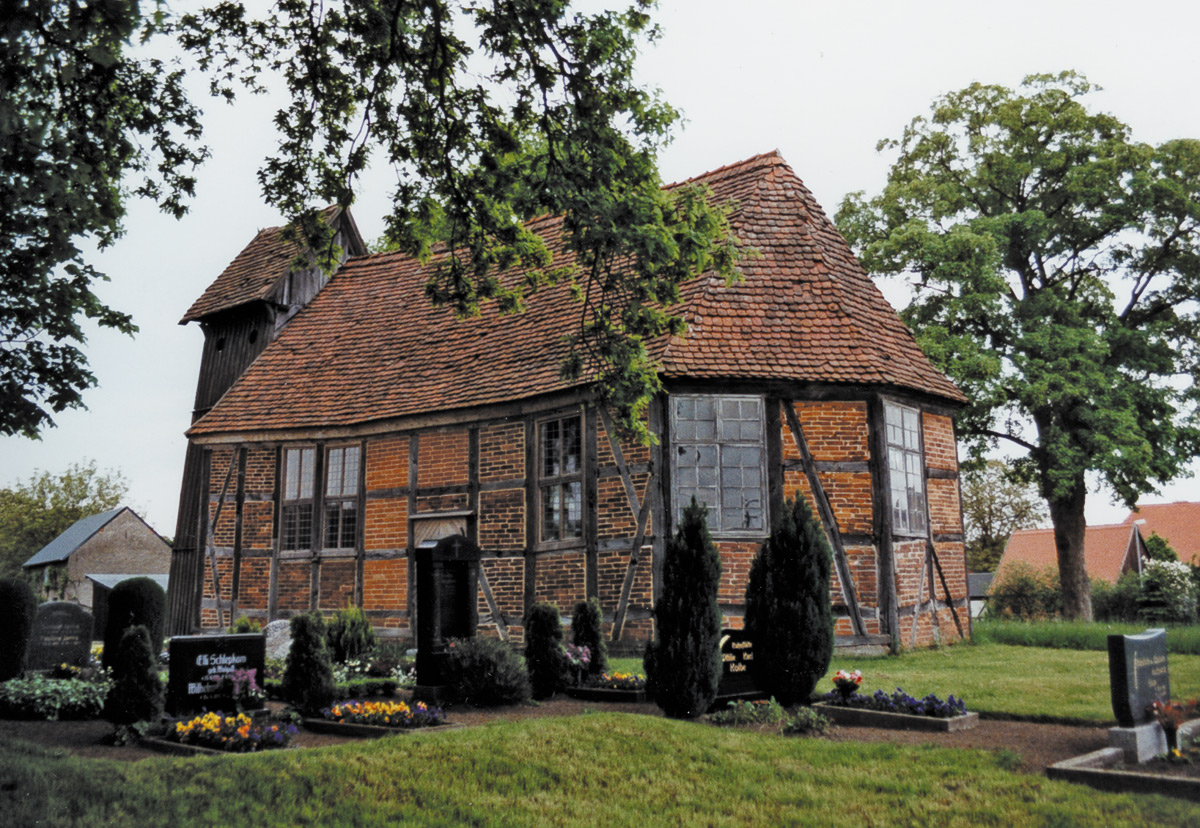
- Church

- Location of Ziegendorf within Ludwigslust-Parchim district
- Interactive map of Ziegendorf
- Location within Germany Location within Mecklenburg-Vorpommern
- Coordinates: 53°17′N 11°49′E
- Country: Germany
- State: Mecklenburg-Vorpommern
- District: Ludwigslust-Parchim
- Municipal assoc.: Parchimer Umland
- Subdivisions: 6

Government
  - Mayor: Wolfgang Mohr

Area
  - Total: 36.78 km^{2} (14.20 sq mi)
- Elevation: 49 m (161 ft)

Population (2025-12-31)
  - Total: 598
  - Density: 16.3/km^{2} (42.1/sq mi)
- Time zone: UTC+01:00 (CET)
  - Summer (DST): UTC+02:00 (CEST)
- Postal codes: 19372
- Dialling codes: 038721
- Vehicle registration: PCH
- Website: www.amt-parchimer-umland.de

Ziegendorf (German pronunciation: [ˈtsiːɡn̩dɔʁf]) is a municipality in the Ludwigslust-Parchim district, in Mecklenburg-Vorpommern, Germany.
