= Stolpe, Parchim =

Stolpe
- Municipality
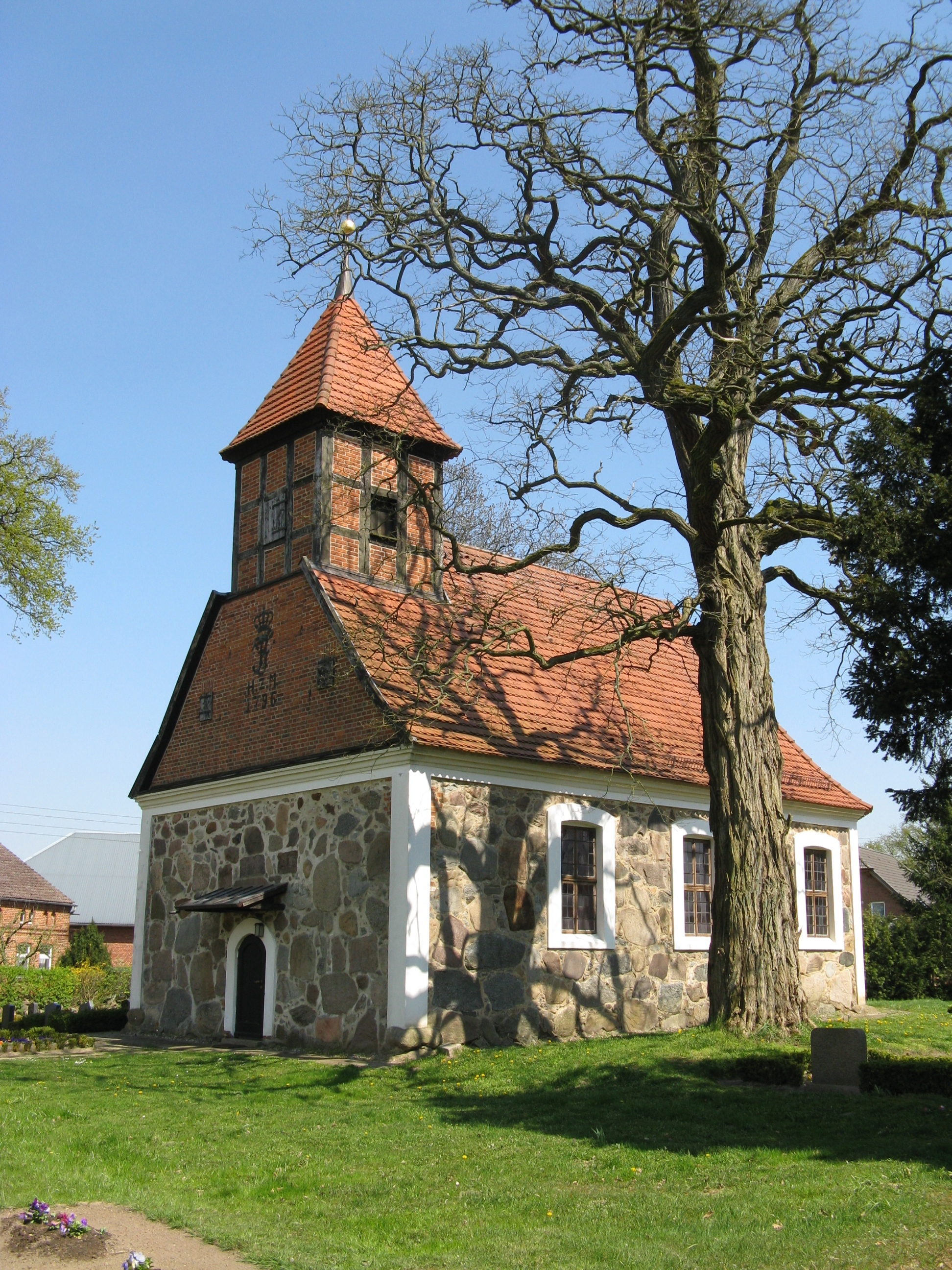
- Church

- Coat of arms

- Location of Stolpe within Ludwigslust-Parchim district
- Interactive map of Stolpe
- Location within Germany Location within Mecklenburg-Vorpommern
- Coordinates: 53°21′N 11°44′E
- Country: Germany
- State: Mecklenburg-Vorpommern
- District: Ludwigslust-Parchim
- Municipal assoc.: Parchimer Umland
- Subdivisions: 3

Government
  - Mayor: Reinhild Fichtner

Area
  - Total: 20.6 km^{2} (8.0 sq mi)
- Elevation: 64 m (210 ft)

Population (2025-12-31)
  - Total: 337
  - Density: 16.4/km^{2} (42.4/sq mi)
- Time zone: UTC+01:00 (CET)
  - Summer (DST): UTC+02:00 (CEST)
- Postal codes: 19372
- Dialling codes: 038725
- Vehicle registration: PCH
- Website: www.amt-parchimer-umland.de

Stolpe (German pronunciation: [ˈʃtɔlpə]) is a municipality in the Ludwigslust-Parchim district, in Mecklenburg-Vorpommern, Germany.
