= Groß Godems =

- Municipality
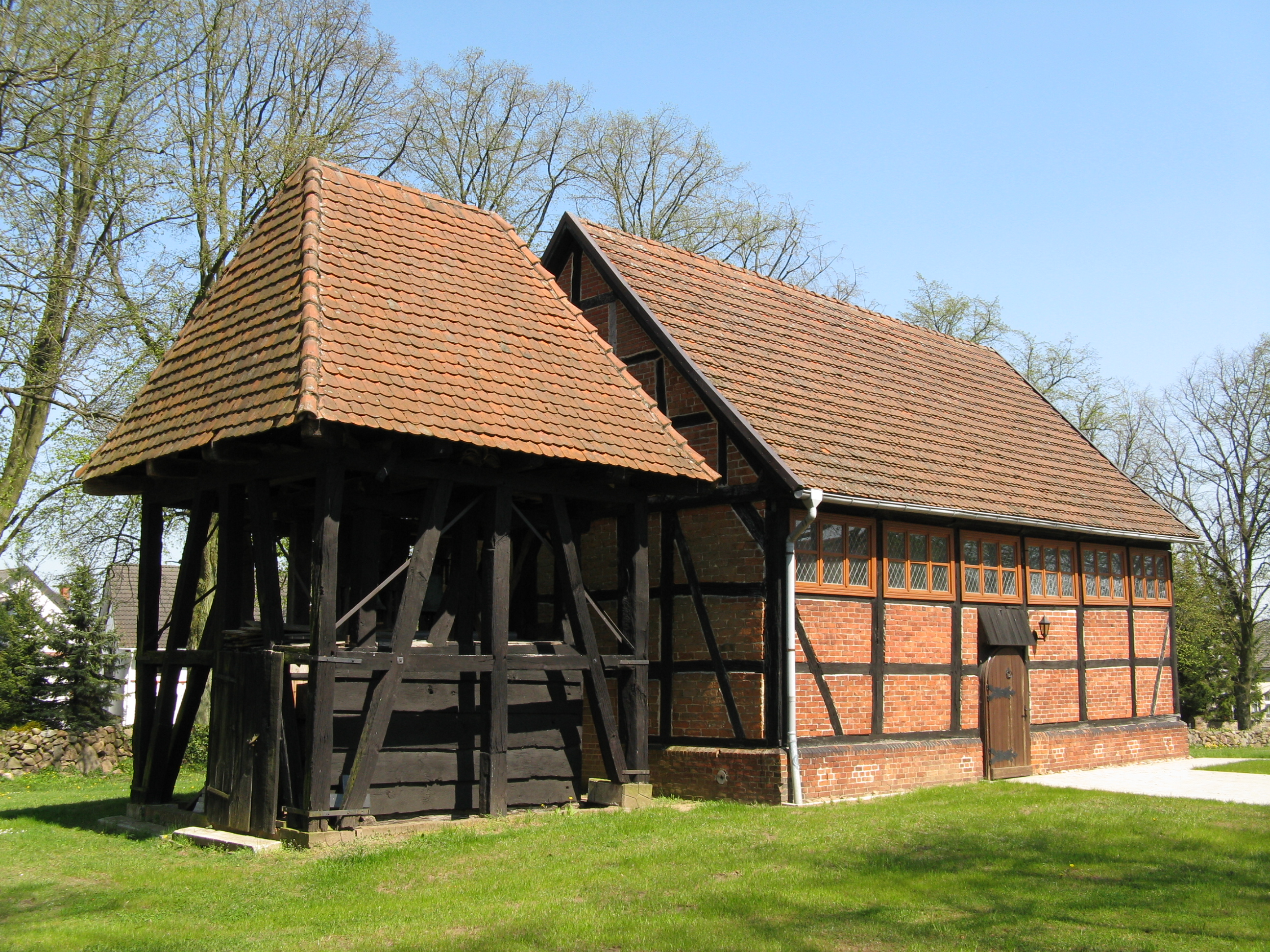
- Church

- Location of Groß Godems within Ludwigslust-Parchim district
- Interactive map of Groß Godems
- Location within Germany Location within Mecklenburg-Vorpommern
- Coordinates: 53°22′N 11°48′E
- Country: Germany
- State: Mecklenburg-Vorpommern
- District: Ludwigslust-Parchim
- Municipal assoc.: Parchimer Umland

Government
  - Mayor: Uta Bossow

Area
  - Total: 15.21 km^{2} (5.87 sq mi)
- Elevation: 65 m (213 ft)

Population (2025-12-31)
  - Total: 385
  - Density: 25.3/km^{2} (65.6/sq mi)
- Time zone: UTC+01:00 (CET)
  - Summer (DST): UTC+02:00 (CEST)
- Postal codes: 19372
- Dialling codes: 038725
- Vehicle registration: PCH
- Website: www.amt-parchimer-umland.de

Groß Godems is a municipality in the Ludwigslust-Parchim district, in Mecklenburg-Vorpommern, Germany.

== Notable people ==
- Carl Abs (1851–1895), professional wrestler
