= Parchimer Umland =

- Amt
- Map of Ludwigslust-Parchim highlighting Parchimer Umland
- Interactive map of Parchimer Umland
- Location within Germany Location within Mecklenburg-Vorpommern
- Coordinates: 53°27′N 11°53′E
- Country: Germany
- State: Mecklenburg-Vorpommern
- District: Ludwigslust-Parchim
- Seat: Parchim
- Subdivisions: 10 municipalities

Area
  - Total: 354.72 km^{2} (136.96 sq mi)

Population (2025-12-31)
  - Total: 7,962
  - Density: 22.45/km^{2} (58.13/sq mi)
- Time zone: UTC+01:00 (CET)
  - Summer (DST): UTC+02:00 (CEST)
- Website: www.amt-parchimer-umland.de

Parchimer Umland is an Amt in the Ludwigslust-Parchim district, in Mecklenburg-Vorpommern, Germany. The seat of the Amt is in Parchim, itself not part of the Amt.

It consists of the following municipalities:

- Domsühl
- Groß Godems
- Karrenzin
- Lewitzrand
- Obere Warnow
- Rom
- Spornitz
- Stolpe
- Ziegendorf
- Zölkow
