= Lewitzrand =

- Municipality
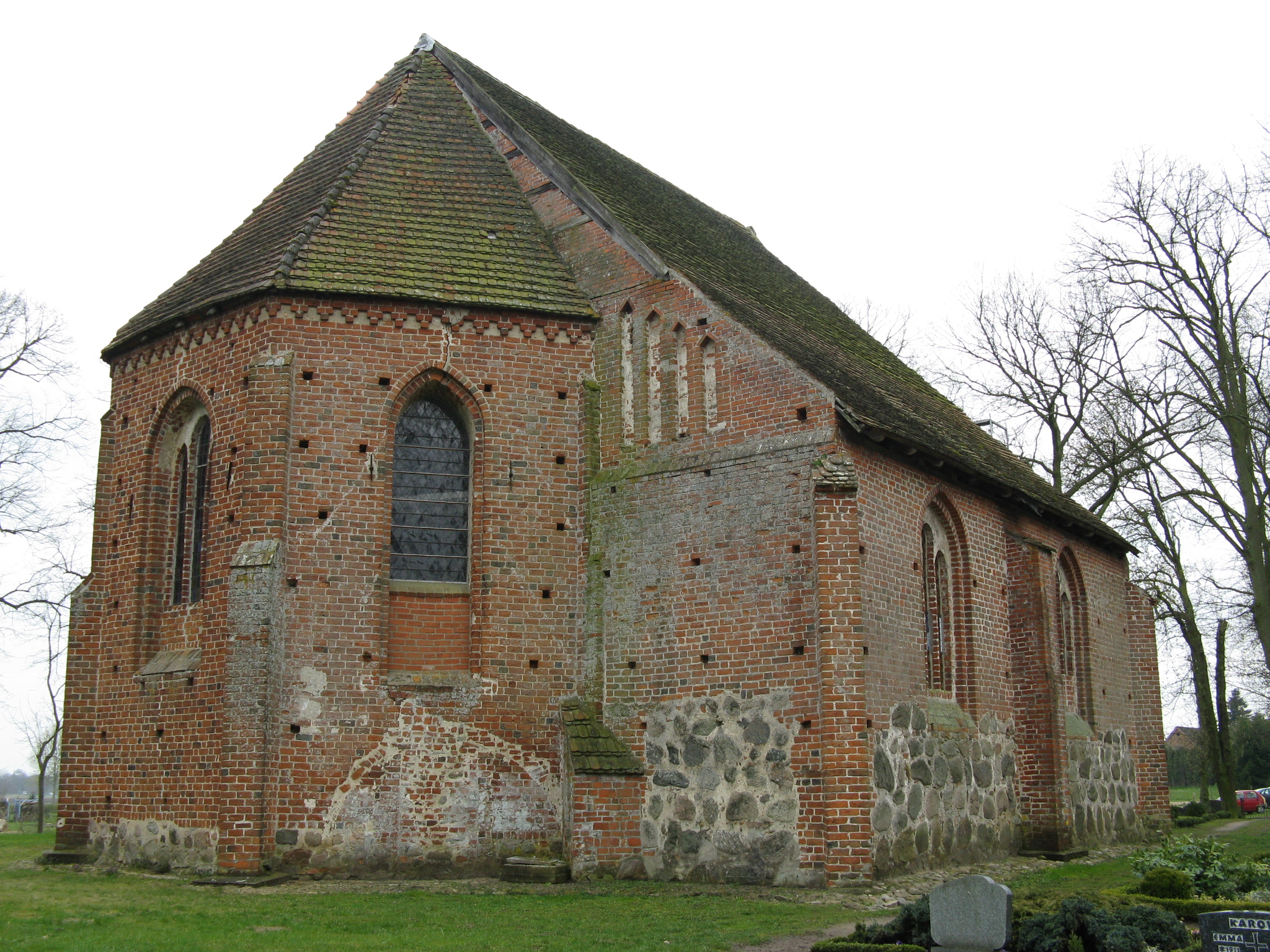
- Church in Klinken

- Location of Lewitzrand within Ludwigslust-Parchim district
- Interactive map of Lewitzrand
- Location within Germany Location within Mecklenburg-Vorpommern
- Coordinates: 53°29′N 11°41′E
- Country: Germany
- State: Mecklenburg-Vorpommern
- District: Ludwigslust-Parchim
- Municipal assoc.: Parchimer Umland

Government
  - Mayor: Wolfgang Hilpert

Area
  - Total: 46.64 km^{2} (18.01 sq mi)
- Elevation: 41 m (135 ft)

Population (2025-12-31)
  - Total: 1,370
  - Density: 29.4/km^{2} (76.1/sq mi)
- Time zone: UTC+01:00 (CET)
  - Summer (DST): UTC+02:00 (CEST)
- Postal codes: 19372, 19374
- Dialling codes: 038722
- Vehicle registration: PCH
- Website: www.amt-parchimer-umland.de

Lewitzrand is a municipality in the Ludwigslust-Parchim district, in Mecklenburg-Vorpommern, Germany. It was created on 7 June 2009 by the merger of the former municipalities Matzlow-Garwitz, Raduhn and Klinken.

== Districts ==
The municipality of Lewitzrand consists of five districts:

- Matzlow
- Garwitz
- Klinken
- Raduhn
- Rusch
