= Obere Warnow =

- Municipality
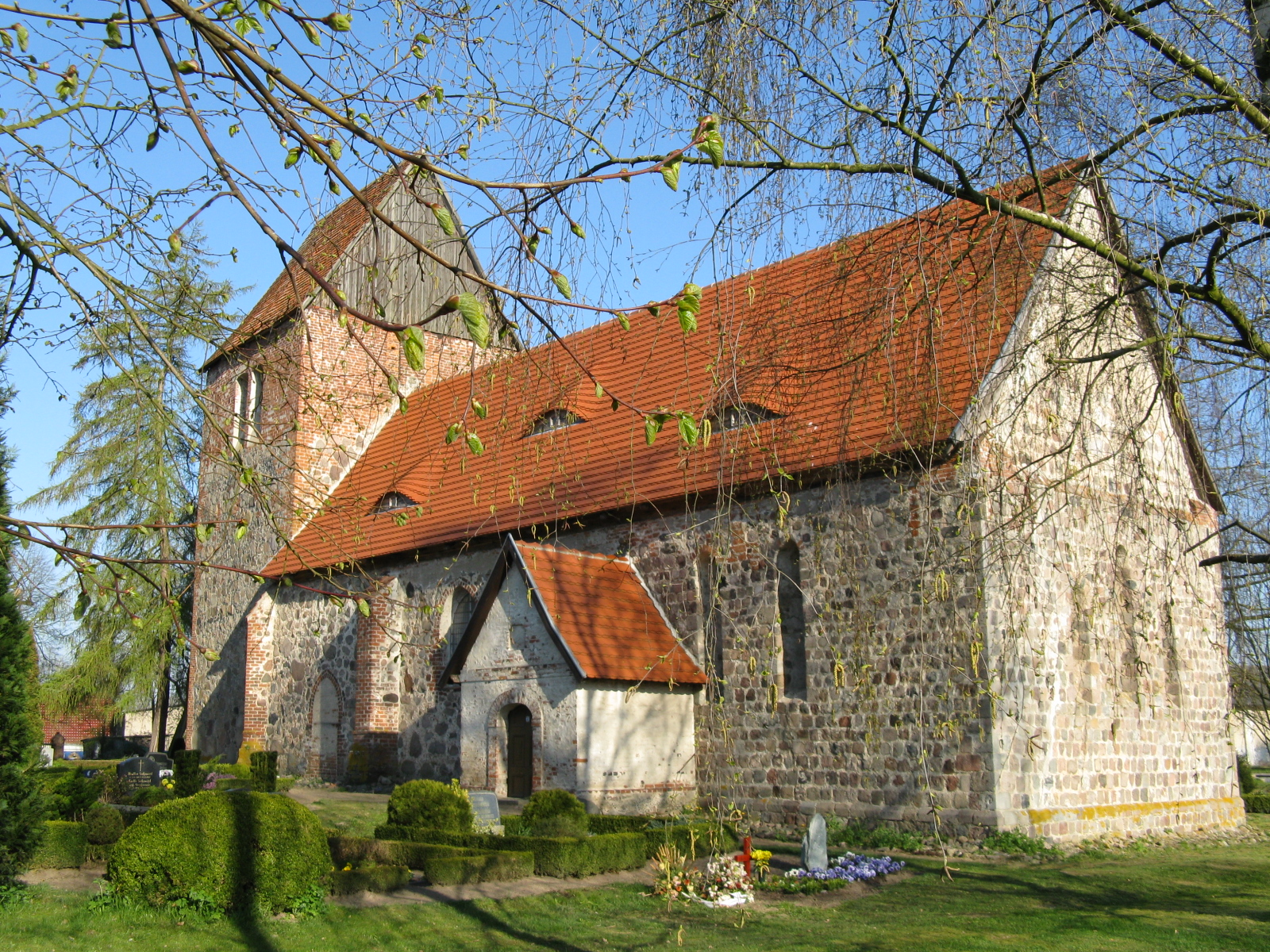
- Grebbin Church

- Location of Obere Warnow within Ludwigslust-Parchim district
- Interactive map of Obere Warnow
- Location within Germany Location within Mecklenburg-Vorpommern
- Coordinates: 53°31′N 11°52′E
- Country: Germany
- State: Mecklenburg-Vorpommern
- District: Ludwigslust-Parchim
- Municipal assoc.: Parchimer Umland

Area
  - Total: 46.47 km^{2} (17.94 sq mi)
- Elevation: 54 m (177 ft)

Population (2025-12-31)
  - Total: 748
  - Density: 16.1/km^{2} (41.7/sq mi)
- Time zone: UTC+01:00 (CET)
  - Summer (DST): UTC+02:00 (CEST)
- Postal codes: 19374
- Dialling codes: 038720
- Vehicle registration: PCH
- Website: www.amt-parchimer-umland.de

Obere Warnow is a municipality in the Ludwigslust-Parchim district, in Mecklenburg-Vorpommern, Germany. It was formed on 1 January 2012 by the merger of the former municipalities Grebbin and Herzberg. It takes its name from the river Warnow, that has its source near Grebbin.
