= Zölkow =

- Municipality
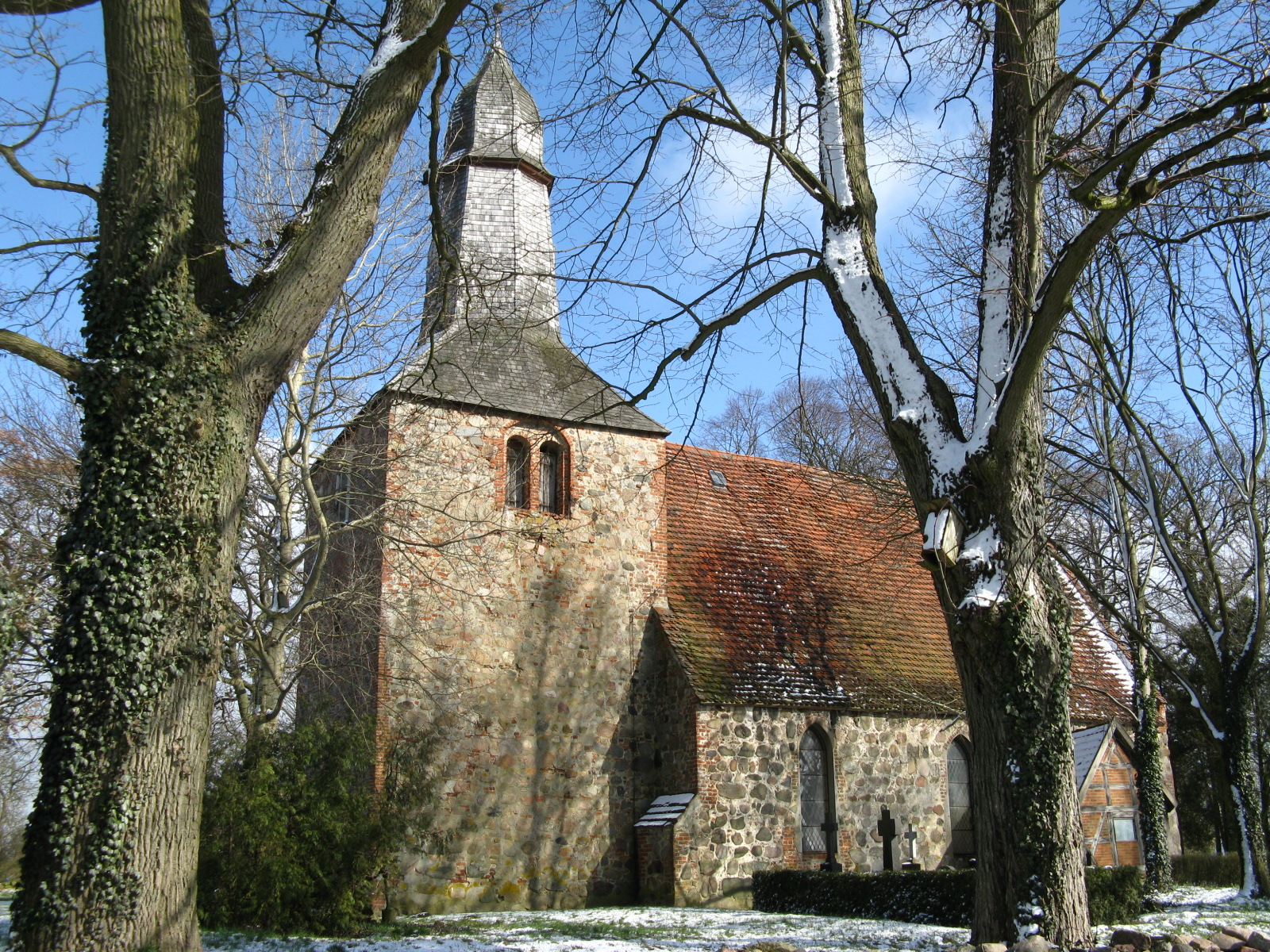
- Church

- Location of Zölkow within Ludwigslust-Parchim district
- Interactive map of Zölkow
- Location within Germany Location within Mecklenburg-Vorpommern
- Coordinates: 53°34′N 11°49′E
- Country: Germany
- State: Mecklenburg-Vorpommern
- District: Ludwigslust-Parchim
- Municipal assoc.: Parchimer Umland

Government
  - Mayor: Gudrun Lübbe

Area
  - Total: 38.73 km^{2} (14.95 sq mi)
- Elevation: 57 m (187 ft)

Population (2025-12-31)
  - Total: 748
  - Density: 19.3/km^{2} (50.0/sq mi)
- Time zone: UTC+01:00 (CET)
  - Summer (DST): UTC+02:00 (CEST)
- Postal codes: 19374
- Dialling codes: 038723
- Vehicle registration: PCH
- Website: www.amt-parchimer-umland.de

Zölkow is a municipality in the Ludwigslust-Parchim district, in Mecklenburg-Vorpommern, Germany.
