= Spornitz =

- Municipality
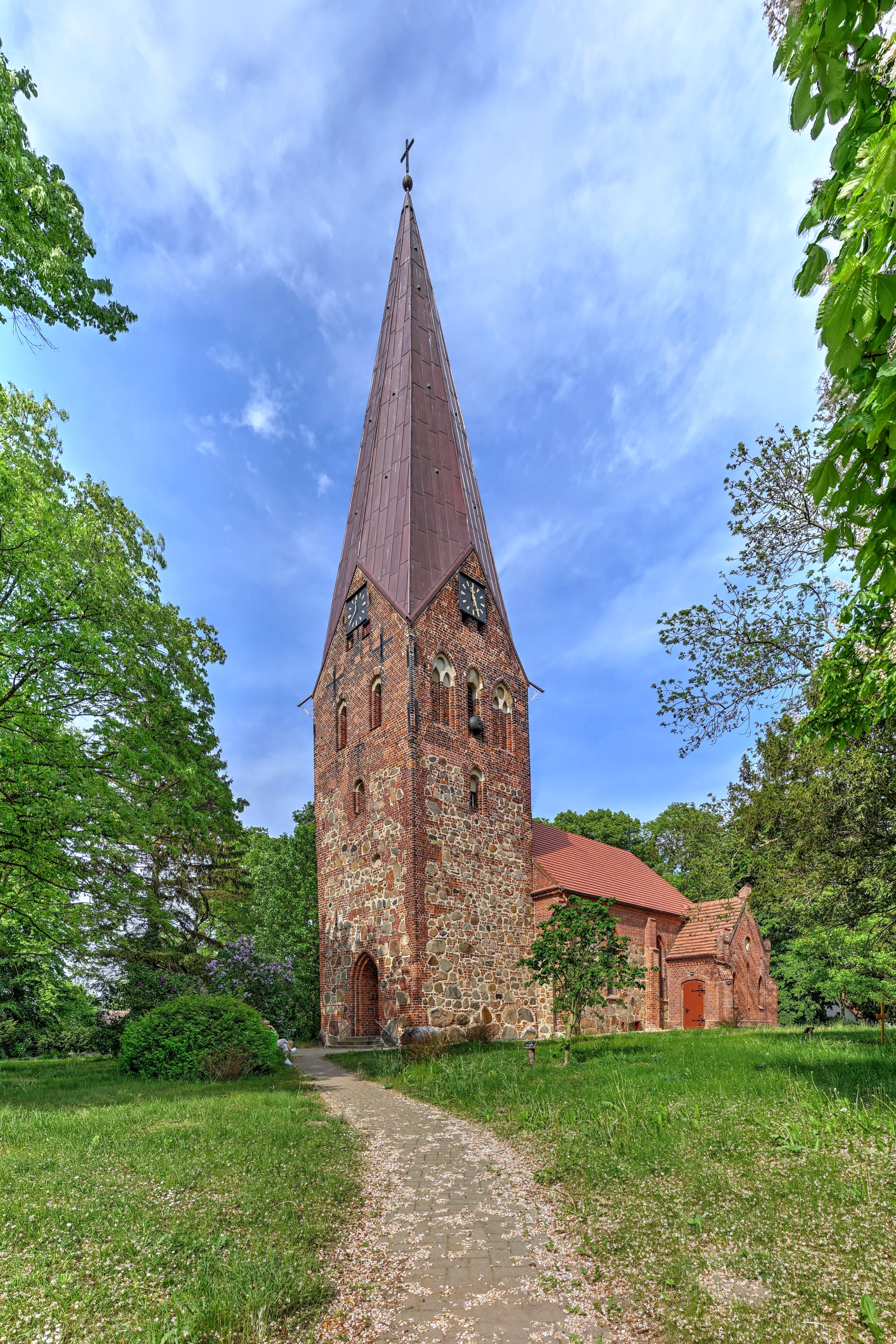
- Church

- Coat of arms

- Location of Spornitz within Ludwigslust-Parchim district
- Interactive map of Spornitz
- Location within Germany Location within Mecklenburg-Vorpommern
- Coordinates: 53°24′N 11°43′E
- Country: Germany
- State: Mecklenburg-Vorpommern
- District: Ludwigslust-Parchim
- Municipal assoc.: Parchimer Umland
- Subdivisions: 4

Government
  - Mayor: Dieter Eckert

Area
  - Total: 48.81 km^{2} (18.85 sq mi)
- Elevation: 82 m (269 ft)

Population (2025-12-31)
  - Total: 1,171
  - Density: 23.99/km^{2} (62.14/sq mi)
- Time zone: UTC+01:00 (CET)
  - Summer (DST): UTC+02:00 (CEST)
- Postal codes: 19372
- Dialling codes: 038726
- Vehicle registration: PCH
- Website: www.amt-parchimer-umland.de

Spornitz is a municipality in the Ludwigslust-Parchim district, in Mecklenburg-Vorpommern, Germany.
