= Domsühl =

- Municipality
- Location of Domsühl within Ludwigslust-Parchim district
- Interactive map of Domsühl
- Location within Germany Location within Mecklenburg-Vorpommern
- Coordinates: 53°29′N 11°46′E
- Country: Germany
- State: Mecklenburg-Vorpommern
- District: Ludwigslust-Parchim
- Municipal assoc.: Parchimer Umland

Government
  - Mayor: Heinz Ullmann

Area
  - Total: 40.11 km^{2} (15.49 sq mi)
- Elevation: 63 m (207 ft)

Population (2025-12-31)
  - Total: 1,286
  - Density: 32.06/km^{2} (83.04/sq mi)
- Time zone: UTC+01:00 (CET)
  - Summer (DST): UTC+02:00 (CEST)
- Postal codes: 19374
- Dialling codes: 038728
- Vehicle registration: PCH
- Website: www.amt-parchimer-umland.de

Domsühl is a municipality in the Ludwigslust-Parchim district, in Mecklenburg-Vorpommern, Germany.
