= Matzlow-Garwitz =

- Ortsteil of Lewitzrand
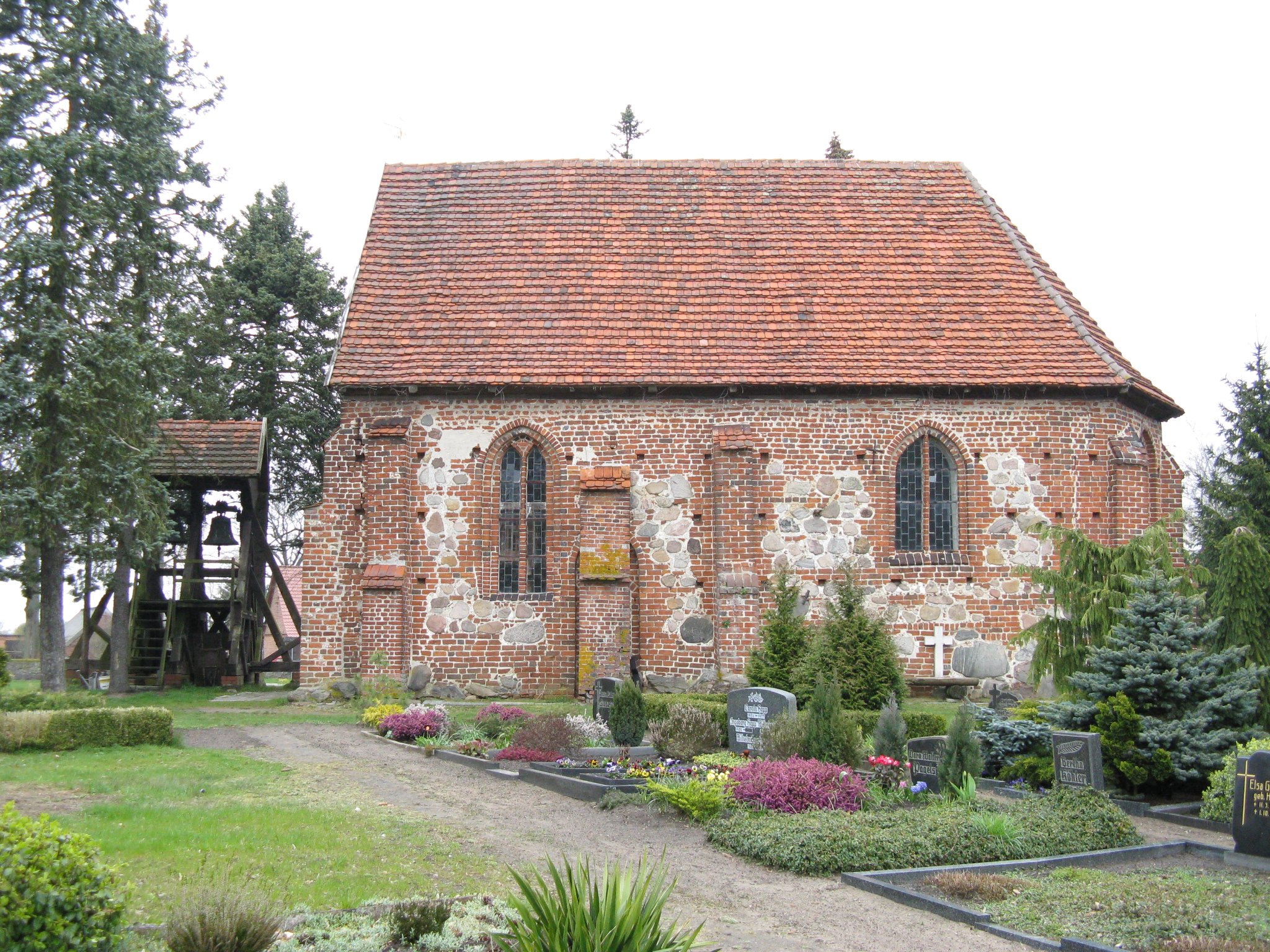
- Church in Garwitz
- Interactive map of Matzlow-Garwitz
- Location within Germany Location within Mecklenburg-Vorpommern
- Coordinates: 53°27′N 11°42′E
- Country: Germany
- State: Mecklenburg-Vorpommern
- District: Ludwigslust-Parchim
- Town: Lewitzrand
- Subdivisions: 2

Area
  - Total: 18.46 km^{2} (7.13 sq mi)
- Elevation: 38 m (125 ft)

Population (2006-12-31)
  - Total: 672
  - Density: 36.4/km^{2} (94.3/sq mi)
- Time zone: UTC+01:00 (CET)
  - Summer (DST): UTC+02:00 (CEST)
- Postal codes: 19374
- Dialling codes: 038722
- Vehicle registration: PCH
- Website: www.amt-parchimer-umland.de

Matzlow-Garwitz is a former municipality in the Ludwigslust-Parchim district, in Mecklenburg-Vorpommern, Germany. Since 7 June 2009, it is part of the municipality Lewitzrand.
