= Griese Gegend =

Coordinates: 53.2500°N 11.2667°E

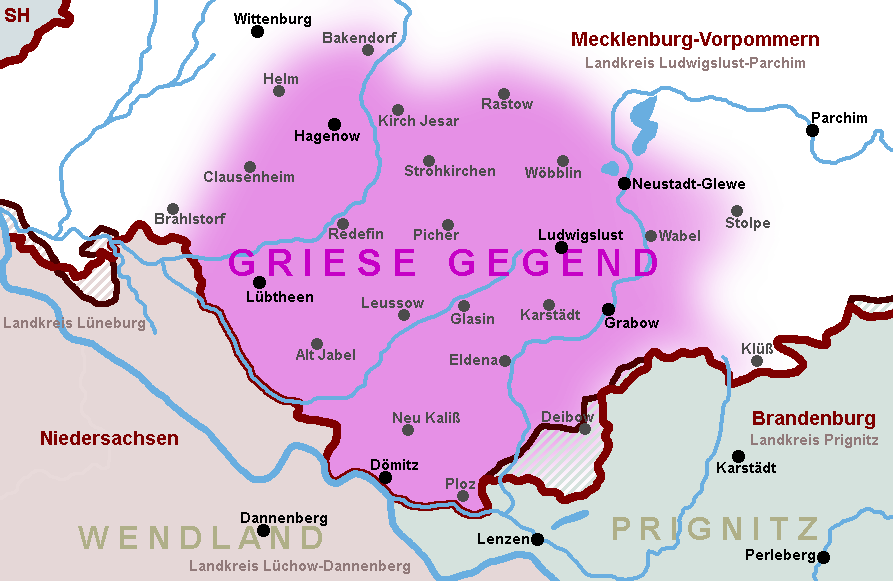
Map of the Griese Gegend

The region of Griese Gegend lies in southwestern Mecklenburg in Germany. In the northwest and north the region is bordered by the River Sude (from Kuhstorf to Lübtheen), the stream of the Strohkirchener Bach and its continuation as the New Canal (this valley is used by the Hagenow to Ludwigslust railway). The region's southeastern border runs roughly from the town of Ludwigslust to Dömitz (following the Elde Canal), in the southwest the River Rögnitz forms the boundary of the Griese Gegend from Woosmer (today a village in the municipality of Vielank) to Lübtheen. The region forms a large triangle.

The origin of the name is not entirely clear; on the one hand the soil – which is mainly sandy – has a grey colour (= griese). In former times, aeolian sand (Flugsand) even entered villages that had to be abandoned. On the other hand the day labourers here wore undyed, grey linen clothes.

The soil is poorly suited for arable farming, and hardly any noble estate owners have established themselves here. As a result there were a lot of state-owned estates in the Griese Gegend that were directly subordinated to Mecklenburg's ruling house. The notorious practice of peasant clearance in order to appropriate land for noble estates (Bauernlegen) was very rare in this area and, as a result, the original farm holdings can still be seen in many villages today.

The Wendish population was able to remain in the Griese Gegend longer than in the rest of Mecklenburg. The once vast heath (Heide) in the area is recalled today in several place names (Heidhof, Pichersche Heide), and these areas have largely given way to forests and farmers' fields.

The formation of the sandur region is due to the retreat of the glacier in the last ice age. All its rivers and streams flow southwest, towards the Lower Elbe.

In the south of the region, around the parish of Malliß, brown coal was mined in open-cast pits from 1817 to 1960, with interruptions.

== Municipalities ==
- Alt Krenzlin
- Belsch
- Bresegard bei Eldena
- Bresegard bei Picher
- Eldena
- Göhlen
- Grebs-Niendorf
- Groß Krams
- Karenz
- Kuhstorf
- Leussow
- Lübtheen, Stadt
- Malk Göhren
- Malliß
- Neu Kaliß
- Picher
- Redefin
- Strohkirchen
- Vielank
- Warlow
- Melkof

== Literature ==
- Becker, Joachim: Aus "de grise Gegend" von Mecklenburg-Schwerin, Verl. Bodenkultur, 1914
