= Malk Göhren =

- Municipality
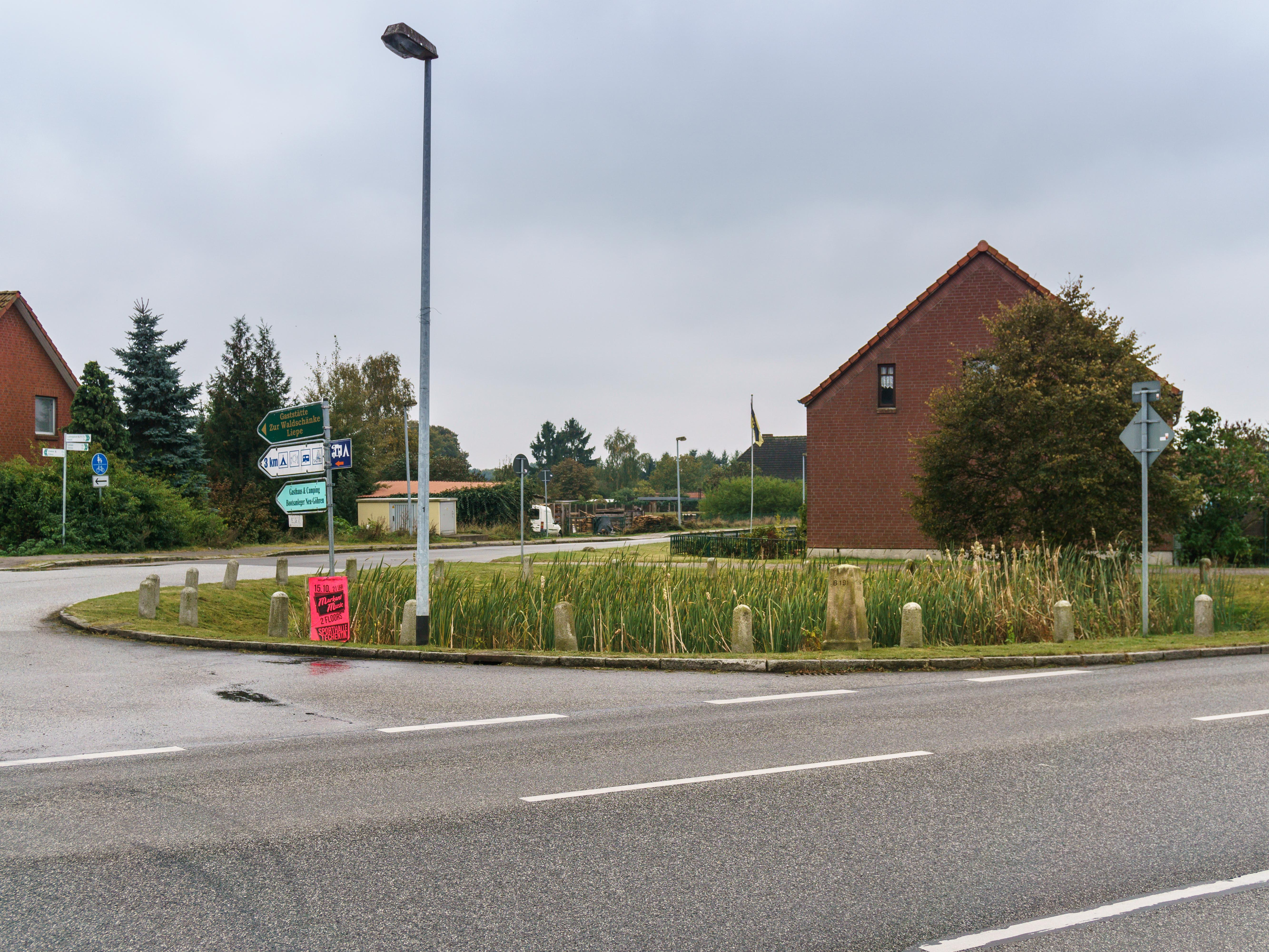
- Obelisk at the convergence of the B191 and Neue Straße in Malk Göhren village

- Location of Malk Göhren within Ludwigslust-Parchim district
- Interactive map of Malk Göhren
- Location within Germany Location within Mecklenburg-Vorpommern
- Coordinates: 53°13′N 11°22′E
- Country: Germany
- State: Mecklenburg-Vorpommern
- District: Ludwigslust-Parchim
- Municipal assoc.: Dömitz-Malliß
- Subdivisions: 3

Government
  - Mayor: Danilo Heike (GMG)

Area
  - Total: 22.56 km^{2} (8.71 sq mi)
- Elevation: 22 m (72 ft)

Population (2025-12-31)
  - Total: 416
  - Density: 18.4/km^{2} (47.8/sq mi)
- Time zone: UTC+01:00 (CET)
  - Summer (DST): UTC+02:00 (CEST)
- Postal codes: 19294
- Dialling codes: 038755
- Vehicle registration: LWL, LUP
- Website: www.malk-goehren.de

Malk Göhren is a municipality in the Ludwigslust-Parchim district, in Mecklenburg-Vorpommern, Germany. Located in the Griese Gegend region, it is subdivided into three ortsteile and is administratively part of the Amt Dömitz-Malliß collective municipality as well as, via its district, the Hamburg Metropolitan Region.

== Geography ==
Malk Göhren has an area of 22.56 square kilometres (8.71 sq mi) that is divided into a total of three ortsteile, those being, besides the village of Malk Göhren itself, Neu Göhren and Liepe. Historically, the settlement of Malk Göhren consists of the historic villages of Malk (in the north) and Göhren (in the south); both are still preserved as Gemarkungen but have merged into a single settlement not just in name but also in actual infrastructure and development. Malk and Göhren were de facto connected since the 1800s due to their proximity and were de jure merged into a unified municipality in 1950 under Göhren's name until being renamed to Malk Göhren in 1993.

Geographically, the municipality is located in the Griese Gegend, not too far from the Elbtalaue region. The municipality's eastern border with Eldena is formed by the Neue Elde river (Müritz-Elde-Wasserstraße) which also bisects the southern part of the municipality between Malk Göhren village and Neu Göhren. The municipality's physical geography is characterized primarily by the Eldetal valley and the farmlands therein. The municipality's south-western (by Liepe) and eastern (by Malk Göhren) border territories are covered by forests. The settlement of Malk Göhren itself is located on the Wanzeberg hill which lies approximately 50 metres (160 ft) above sea level.

The B191 federal road bisects the settlement of Malk Göhren itself and the northern part of the municipality as a whole from west to east, connecting the settlement directly to Malliß and Eldena. The whole of the municipal territory is bisected north to south by the K45 district road that branches off from the B191 in Malk Göhren settlement and ends near the village of Liepe.

Malk Göhren borders Bresegard bei Eldena to the north, Eldena to the north-east and east, Gorlosen to the south-east, Neu Kaliß to the south-west, Malliß to the west, and Karenz to the north-west. The campground and dock of Neu Göhren are located just outside the municipal border.

== History ==
The territory now occupied by the municipality was previously settled by the Linones, a Polabian tribe associated with the Obotrites. Specifically, the settlements's territories were part of the Land Wehningen Gau in the later Obotrite confederation.

The village of Malk Göhren proper has historically consisted of the settlements of Malk (in the north) and Göhren (in the south). Malk was first mentioned in 1156 as Malke, making it one of the oldest known settlements in Ludwigslust-Parchim. Göhren, which was first mentioned in 1308 as Gorne, takes its name from the nearby Gore-Berg hill. Both names are of Slavic origin. Both villages were part of the County of Dannenberg until the mid-14th century when its territories north of the Elbe were passed to the Duchy of Mecklenburg. The territory has been part of Mecklenburg ever since.

The two settlements were de facto connected by infrastructure and development since the 1800s due to their proximity. On 1 July 1950, Malk was annexed into the municipality of Göhren, uniting the two settlements into a single municipality for the first time. Nonetheless, the two settlements remained formally separate as not just their historical Gemarkungen (which persist to this day) but also as separate ortsteile. On 4 November 1993 then, the municipality was renamed from Göhren to Malk Göhren; this name change coincided with the merger of the two settlements into a single village (ortsteil) of the same name which continues to form the municipality's capital settlement.

On 1 October 1972, Liepe (which included Neu Göhren), until then a separate municipality, was merged into the municipality of Göhren (later Malk Göhren).

Malk Göhren used to be a stop on the Ludwigslust–Dömitz railway between 1890 and 2001. The train station was located 2 kilometres (1.2 mi) south of the main settlement. The station was renamed from Göhren (Meckl) to Malk Göhren in 1995, two years after the municipality was renamed.

== Demographics ==
Historical population

Year	Pop.	±%
1843	466	—
1885	635	+36.3%
1901	818	+28.8%
1933	768	−6.1%
1939	731	−4.8%
1946	751	+2.7%

Year	Pop.	±%
1990	531	−29.3%
2001	565	+6.4%
2011	456	−19.3%
2022	403	−11.6%
2024	414	+2.7%

Data may be affected by territorial fluctuation.
Sources: 1843,1885, 1901, 1933 & 1939, 1946, 1990-2024

Settlement		1843	1885	1901	1933	1939	1946	1990	2001	2011	2022 (Note: The population numbers by settlement in 2022 are estimates based on the 2022 German census and do not actually add up to the correct total.)	2024
Malk Göhren	Malk	–	–	142	141	138	183	531	565	456	72	414
Malk Göhren	Göhren	466	356	395	350	328	315	531	565	456	267	414
Neu Göhren		–	170	162	–	–	–	531	565	456	68	414
Liepe		–	109	119	277	265	253	531	565	456	60	414
Total		466	635	818	768	731	751	531	565	456	403	414

== Politics ==
=== Municipal council ===
The municipal council of Malk Göhren consists of six seats and has long been dominated by the local voters' association Gemeinde Malk Göhren (GMG). The current council was elected during the 2024 Mecklenburg-Vorpommern local elections with the following result:

Party	Votes	Share		Seats	
Party	Votes	%	+/-	Won	+/–
Gemeinde Malk Göhren	675	75.25	▼9.28	4	▼2
Ind. Cordula Westendorf	131	14.60	New	1	▲1
Christian Democratic Union of Germany	91	10.14	New	1	▲1
Total	897	100.0		6	0
Valid votes	897	98.36			
Invalid/blank votes	9	0.99			
Total votes	906	100.0			
Turnout	304	81.72	▲13.28		
Eligible voters	372				

Previous elections had the following results:

Year Party	2024		2019	
Year Party	%	Seats	%	Seats
GMG	75.25	4	100.0	6
CDU	10.14	1	Did not run	
Independents	14.60	1 (Note: Cordula Westendorf)	Did not run	
Total	100.0	6	100.0	6

=== Mayor ===
The current mayor of Malk Göhren is Danilo Heike of the GMG. He was elected during the 2024 Mecklenburg-Vorpommern local elections with 57.48%, winning against his opponent, the incumbent independent Siegmund Holter who received 42.52%. Holter previously served as the municipality's mayor after being re-elected on the GMG ticket in 2019.

List of mayors:

- 2004–2014: Wolfgang Heike
- 2014–2024: Siegmund Holter (GMG)
- since 2024: Danilo Heike (GMG)

=== Seal ===
The municipality does not have a coat of arms or flag, instead it only uses a seal which is defined in the municipal statute as the bull's head of Mecklenburg surrounded by the text "GEMEINDE MALK GÖHREN". Malk Göhren does however have a logo which shows an armed knight with red shield and cape on a brown horse jumping over three green hills.
