= Holdseelen =

- Gemarkung of Grabow
- Interactive map of Holdseelen
- Location within Germany Location within Mecklenburg-Vorpommern
- Coordinates: 53°09′11″N 11°29′44″E
- Country: Germany
- State: Mecklenburg-Vorpommern
- District: Ludwigslust-Parchim
- Town: Grabow

Area
  - Total: 2.89 km^{2} (1.12 sq mi)
- Elevation: 36 m (118 ft)

Population (2022)
  - Total: 0
  - Density: 0.0/km^{2} (0.0/sq mi)
- Time zone: UTC+01:00 (CET)
  - Summer (DST): UTC+02:00 (CEST)
- Postal codes: 19300
- Dialling codes: 038792
- Vehicle registration: LWL, LUP
- Website: www.amt-grabow.de

Holdseelen is an abandoned settlement and Gemarkung in the municipality of Grabow within the Ludwigslust-Parchim district of Mecklenburg-Vorpommern, Germany.

== Geography ==
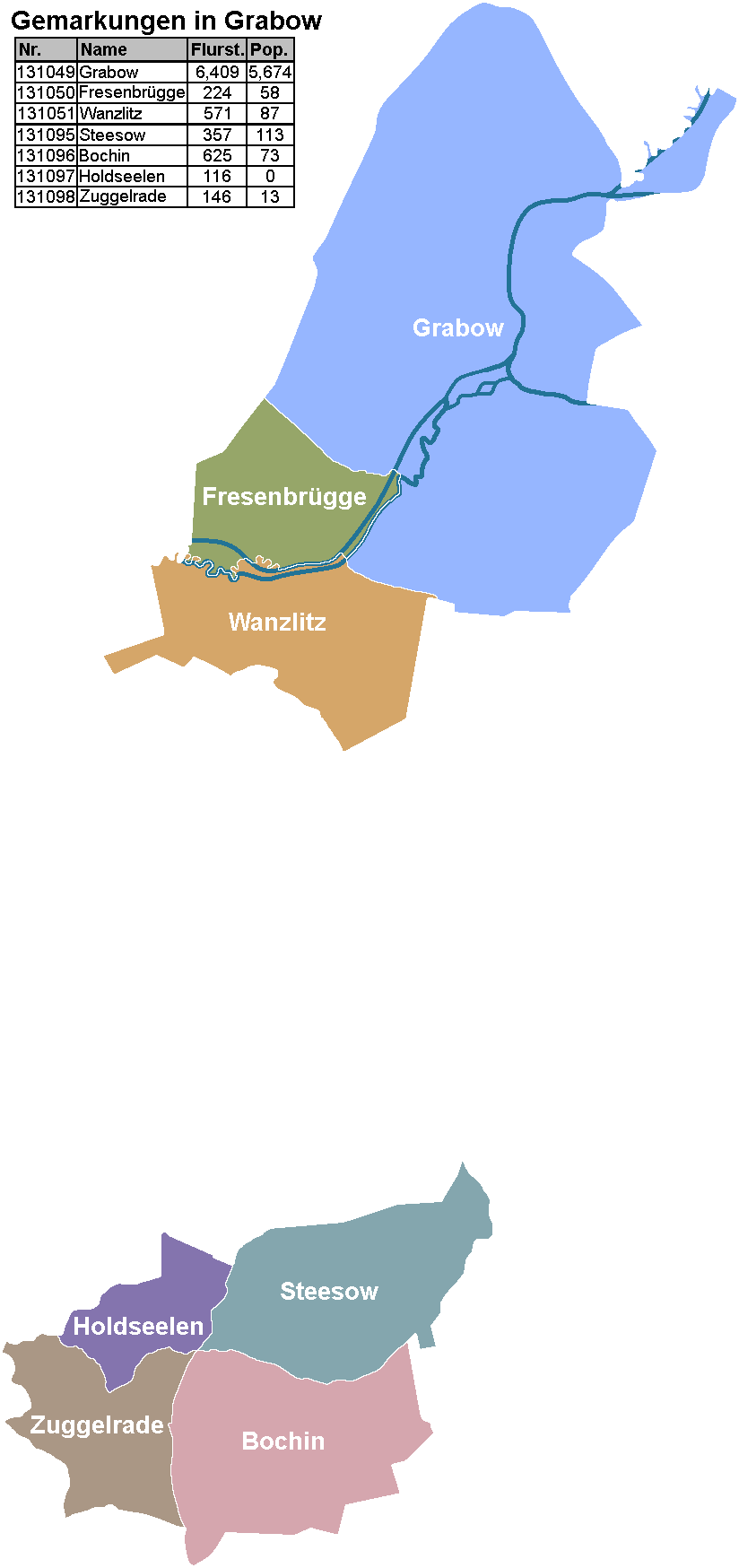
Holdseelen is one of the four Gemarkungen in the exclave and former municipality of Steesow within Grabow.

Officially known as the Former Estate of Holdseelen (German: ehemaliges Rittergut Holdseelen), the Gemarkung has an area of 2.89 square kilometres (1.12 sq mi) and consists of 116 plots (Flurstücke). With its southern border being formed by the Göbengraben ditch, the Gemarkung consists primarily of farmland with forest coverage in its far north and in a small area around the former estate building itself. The Gemarkung is bisected by a road on which the former estate lies.

It is one of the few settlements in southern Ludwigslust-Parchim that historically and geographically belong to the region of Prignitz rather than the Griese Gegend.

The village lies around 6 kilometres (3.7 mi) north of Lenzen (Elbe), the nearest town, and 14 kilometres (8.7 mi) south-west of the municipal centre in Grabow. The centre of its previous municipality, Steesow, a village of the same name, lies around 3 kilometres (1.9 mi) north-east of Holdseelen. The closest settlements are the villages of Zuggelrade, roughly 2 kilometres (1.2 mi) to the south-west; Bochin to the south-east and Krinitz (part of Milow) to the north-west, with the latter two being roughly 3 kilometres (1.9 mi) away respectively.

== History ==
The name Holdseelen is likely a corruption of its medieval name, Sehlen, possibly from the Slavic Selin, which had been given the addition of Holtz (wood) due to being used as a forestry for a time. The phrase Im Siel Holtz is specifically linked to the origin of Holdseelen's name. It has also been posited that the name could be of, at least partially, Westphalian origin, as the settler's Altsiedelland.

The land that used to hold the Holdseelen estate was home to a medieval village by the name of Sehlen, which was originally settled by the Slavs, that had become a Wüstung, before the mid-1600s, leaving only the estate at this location. Before 1545, Holdseelen was owned by the von Kruge family, being administered from Pröttlin and Deibow. From 1546 until after 1828, the estate was owned by the von Blumenthal family (as part of Herrschaft Pröttlin) which used it as one of its primary knightly seats. In 1844, it was owned by Hans Carl F.A.F. Matthias zu Havelberg who passed the estate to his widow Hackradt zu Pröttlin in 1856. In 1877, it was under the ownership of Krull zu Havelberg until finally being owned by the von Plotho family (Siegfried & Karl) in 1907. All heads of the estate were of the rank Freiherr. Since 1931, Holdseelen has been part of the municipality of Bochin (1931 as Wohnplatz, 1964 as Ortsteil) which itself became part of the municipality of Steesow in 1972.

The last owners of Holdseelen were the Heike family and the estate was probably abandoned following 1945. In 1998, much of the manor, which had by that point fallen into ruin, was demolished. Foundation walls of the buildings still exist however and are recognized as a historically important sight. The former pond of the estate is a protected biotope.

Holdseelen, as the three other Gemarkungen in the municipality of Steesow (Bochin, Zuggelrade, and Steesow itself), was annexed into the municipality of Grabow on 1 January 2016. In the summer of that year, there was also a minor territorial exchange between the Gemarkung Holdseelen (part of Grabow) and the Gemarkung Krinitz in Milow affecting 14 plots. In the early 2020s, a wind farm within the Gemarkung was planned.

== Demographics ==
Historical population

Year	Pop.	±%
1772	16	—
1791	31	+93.8%
1801	30	−3.2%
1817	31	+3.3%
1837	36	+16.1%

Year	Pop.	±%
1858	42	+16.7%
1871	37	−11.9%
1895	28	−24.3%
1925	43	+53.6%
2022	0	−100.0%

Data may be affected by territorial fluctuation.
Sources: 1772–1925, 2022
