= Zuggelrade =

- Ortsteil of Grabow
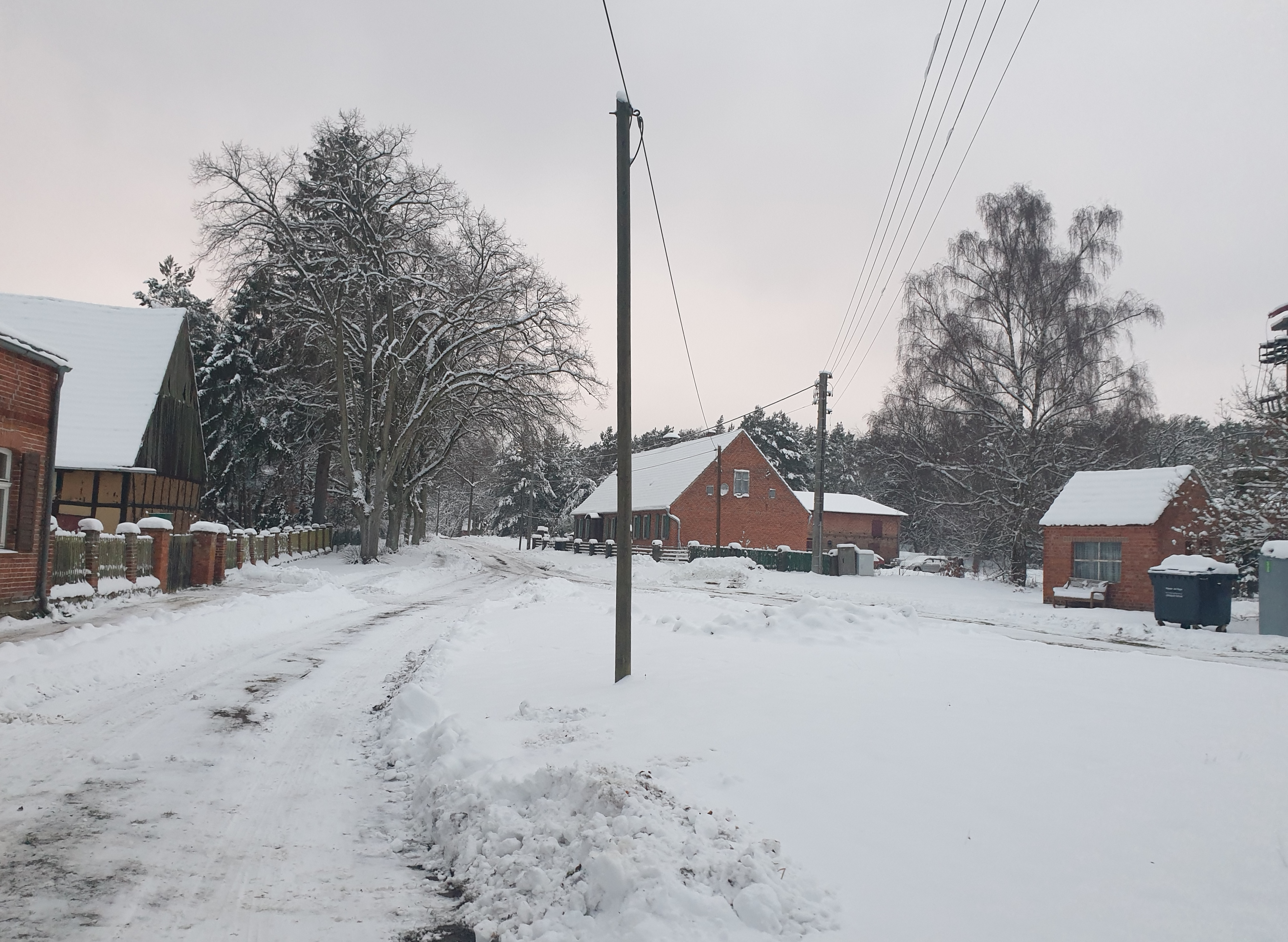
- Zuggelrade turning circle in winter
- Interactive map of Zuggelrade
- Location within Germany Location within Mecklenburg-Vorpommern
- Coordinates: 53°08′39″N 11°28′37″E
- Country: Germany
- State: Mecklenburg-Vorpommern
- District: Ludwigslust-Parchim
- Town: Grabow

Area
  - Total: 5 km^{2} (1.9 sq mi)
- Elevation: 36 m (118 ft)

Population (2022)
  - Total: 13
  - Density: 2.6/km^{2} (6.7/sq mi)
- Time zone: UTC+01:00 (CET)
  - Summer (DST): UTC+02:00 (CEST)
- Postal codes: 19300
- Dialling codes: 038792
- Vehicle registration: LWL, LUP
- Website: www.amt-grabow.de

Zuggelrade is a village and ortsteil in the municipality of Grabow within the Ludwigslust-Parchim district of Mecklenburg-Vorpommern, Germany.

== Geography ==
Zuggelrade is surrounded by a forest on all sides and lies on the Bochiner Straße (Kreisstraße 51) which runs south of the village proper. To the north of Zuggelrade lies the Göbengraben ditch which forms the border between its Gemarkung and that of the former knightly estate of Holdseelen.

It is one of the few settlements in southern Ludwigslust-Parchim that historically and geographically belong to the region of Prignitz rather than the Griese Gegend.

The village lies around 6 kilometres (3.7 mi) north of Lenzen (Elbe), the nearest town, and 16 kilometres (9.9 mi) south-west of the municipal centre in Grabow. The centre of its previous municipality, Steesow, a village of the same name, lies around 5 kilometres (3.1 mi) north-east of Zuggelrade. The closest settlements to Zuggelrade are the villages Bochin to the south-east and Krinitz (part of Milow) to the north-west, both roughly 3 kilometres (1.9 mi) away respectively.

== History ==
Zuggelrade was first mentioned in 1542 as Czuckelrade. In 1542, it was mentioned as Zuchelradt, and some later documentation (in the early 19th century) attribute the name Zuckehade to it.

The village historically belonged to the district of Westprignitz in the geographical region of Prignitz in Brandenburg until the dissolution of the states in East Germany which saw the village become part of the Bezirk Schwerin. After German reunification, the village was added to the new state of Mecklenburg-Vorpommern as part of the former district of Ludwigslust. As opposed to Lenzen and the settlements closest to it, Zuggelrade and its immediate neighbors decided to stay in Mecklenburg-Vorpommern rather than joining Brandenburg in 1992.

In 1960, Zuggelrade was home to an LPG Type I farming cooperative with 22 members and 157.70 hectares (389.7 acres) or 1.58 square kilometres (0.61 sq mi) in farmland named "Frieden" (Peace). In 1968 it was merged with the LPG "Thomas Müntzer" in Bochin into the LPG "August Bebel" in Steesow.

The previously independent municipality of Zuggelrade was annexed into the municipality of Bochin in 1965, which was itself annexed into Steesow in 1973. On 1 January 2016, Zuggelrade, as part of the municipality of Steesow, was annexed into Grabow, becoming a hinterland village of the town.

In early April 2019, a forest fire started near Zuggelrade that affected around 700 square metres (7,500 sq ft). Despite a difficult logistic situation, 40 firefighters from Grabow and Lenzen were able to extinguish the flames later that day.

== Demographics ==
Historical population

Year	Pop.	±%
1734	38	—
1772	84	+121.1%
1791	103	+22.6%
1801	88	−14.6%
1817	76	−13.6%
1837	98	+28.9%
1858	111	+13.3%
1871	74	−33.3%

Year	Pop.	±%
1895	76	+2.7%
1910	71	−6.6%
1925	86	+21.1%
1933	77	−10.5%
1939	57	−26.0%
1946	78	+36.8%
1964	50	−35.9%
2022	13	−74.0%

Data may be affected by territorial fluctuation.
Sources: 1896-1946, 1933, 1939, 1734-1871/1925/1964, 2022

== Politics ==
Zuggelrade is one of the 7 hinterland villages of Grabow recognized as ortsteile. It, as the other settlements in the former municipality of Steesow, was part of an Ortsteilvertretung that replaced the municipal council upon annexation of the municipality of Steesow into Grabow on 1 January 2016. It existed until the third changing statute to the municipal constitution on 2 July 2019.

== Gallery ==
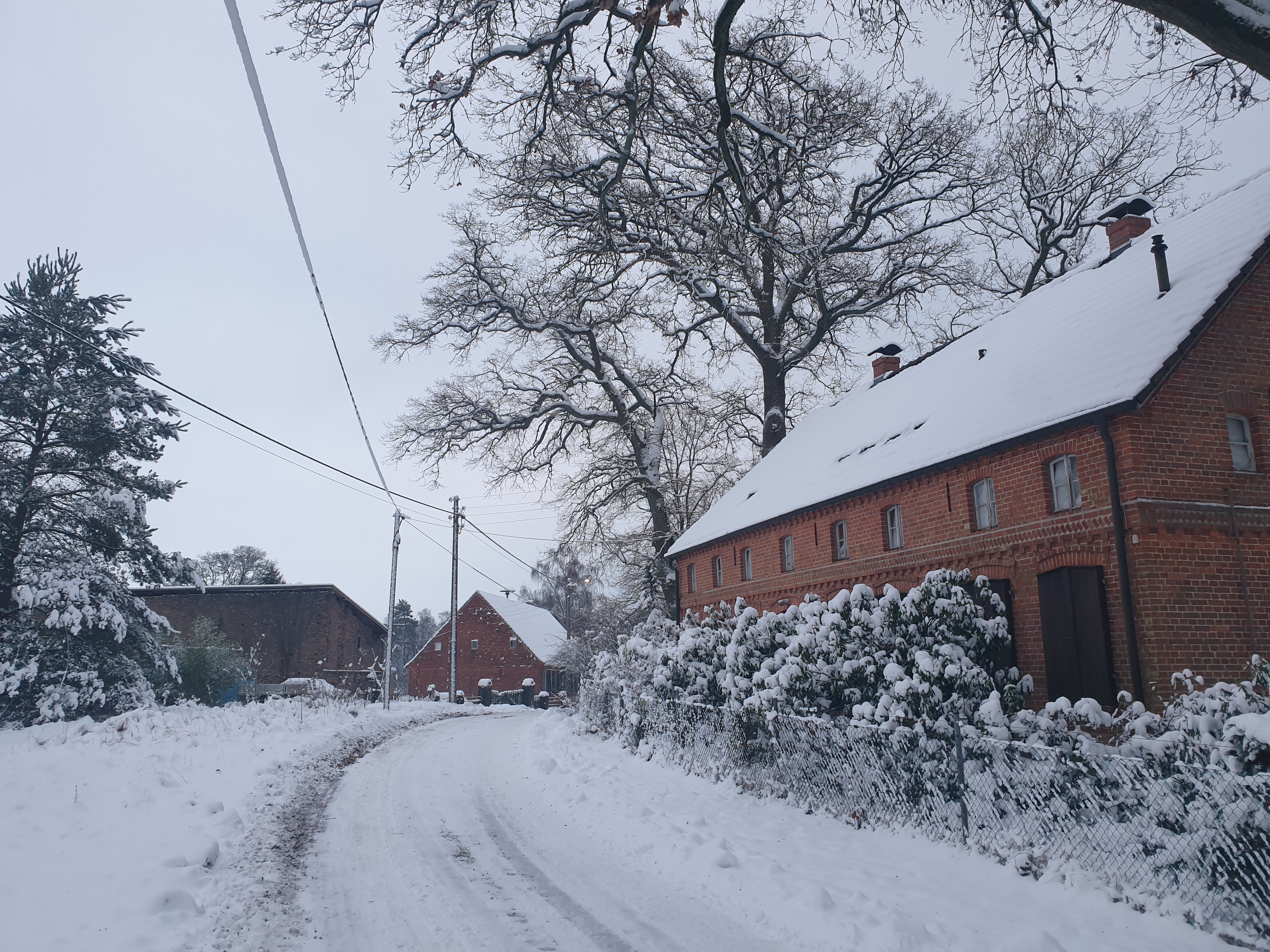
Zuggelrade Waldstraße

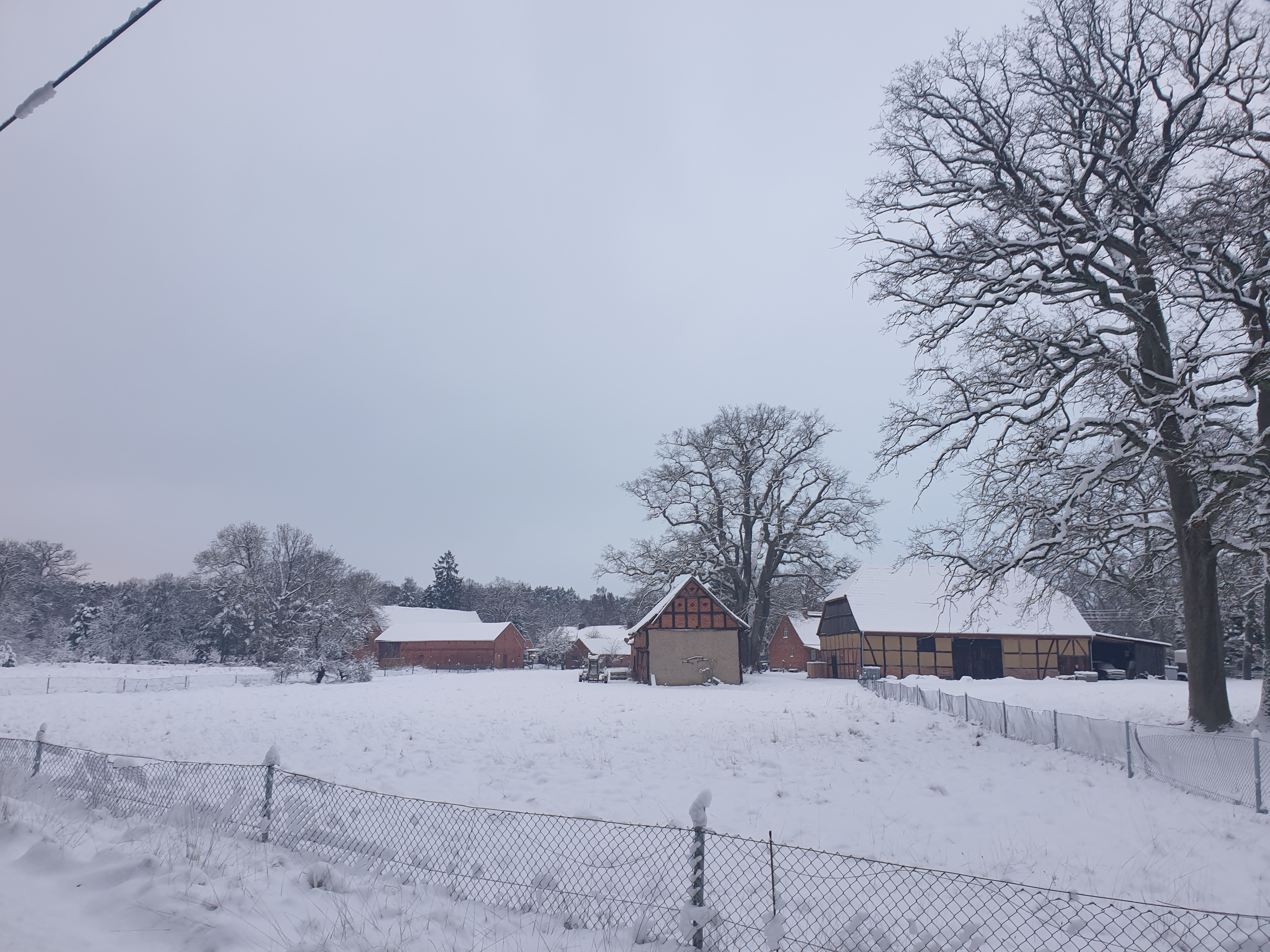
Zuggelrade as viewed from the K51

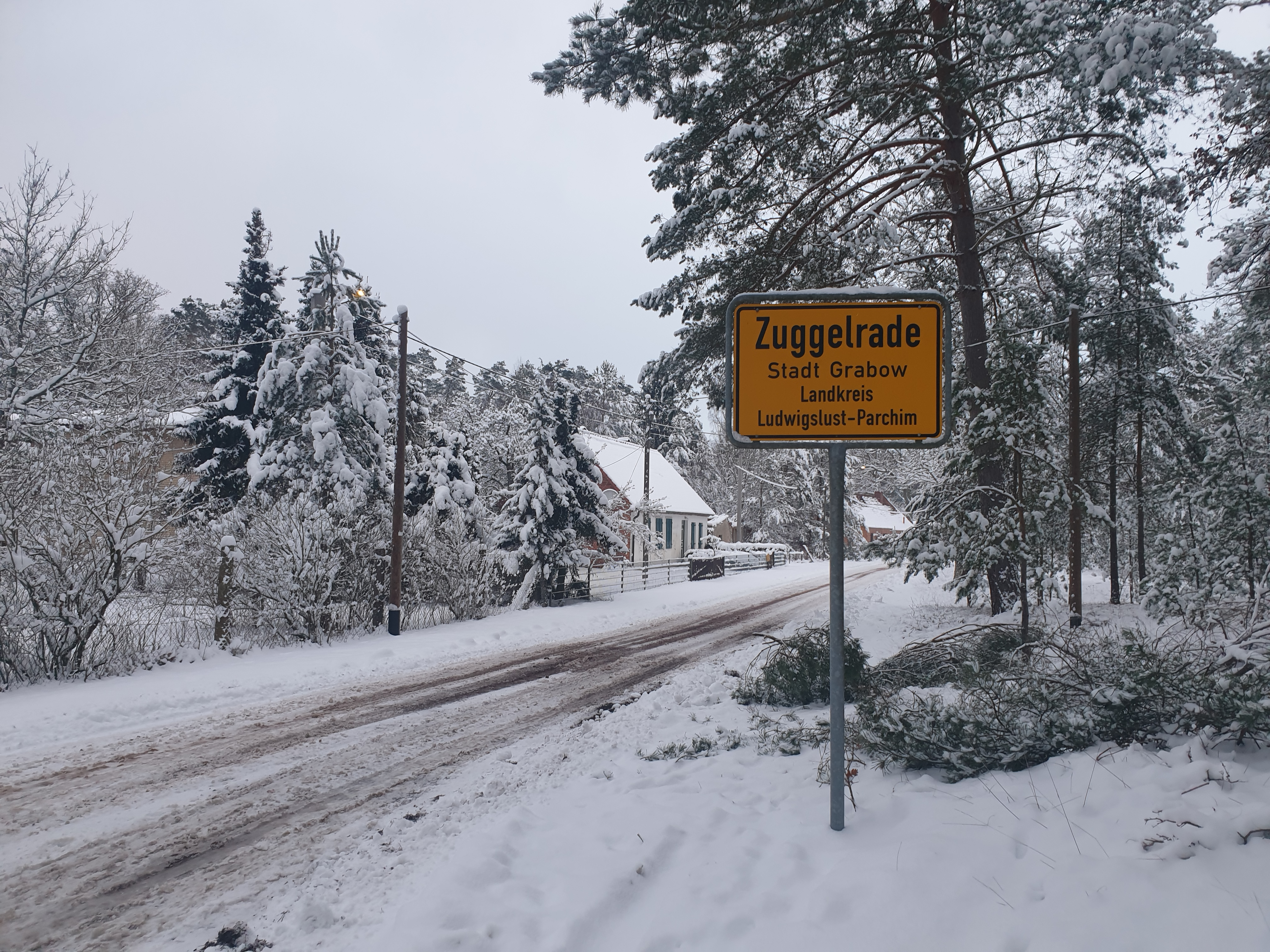
Town sign of Zuggelrade
