= Bresegard =

Bresegard may refer to two municipalities in the district of Ludwigslust, Mecklenburg-Vorpommern, Germany:

- Bresegard bei Eldena
- Bresegard bei Picher
