= Lüblow =

- Municipality
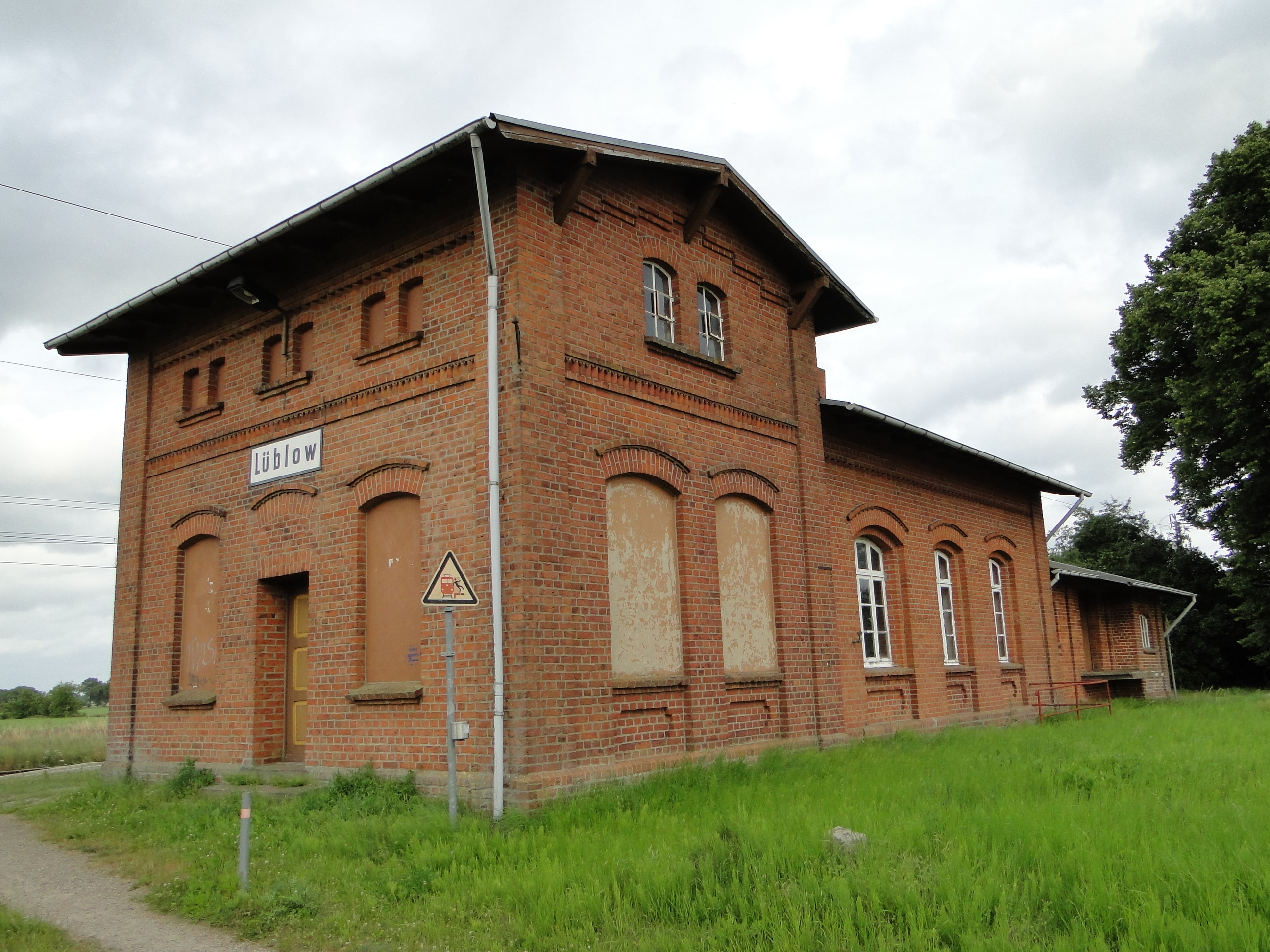
- Lüblow train station

- Location of Lüblow within Ludwigslust-Parchim district
- Interactive map of Lüblow
- Location within Germany Location within Mecklenburg-Vorpommern
- Coordinates: 53°24′N 11°27′E
- Country: Germany
- State: Mecklenburg-Vorpommern
- District: Ludwigslust-Parchim
- Municipal assoc.: Ludwigslust-Land
- Subdivisions: 2

Government
  - Mayor: Lothar Seliger

Area
  - Total: 21.42 km^{2} (8.27 sq mi)
- Elevation: 34 m (112 ft)

Population (2025-12-31)
  - Total: 544
  - Density: 25.4/km^{2} (65.8/sq mi)
- Time zone: UTC+01:00 (CET)
  - Summer (DST): UTC+02:00 (CEST)
- Postal codes: 19288
- Dialling codes: 038753
- Vehicle registration: LWL
- Website: www.amt-ludwigslust-land.de

Lüblow is a municipality in the Ludwigslust-Parchim district, in Mecklenburg-Vorpommern, Germany.
