= Uelitz =

- Municipality
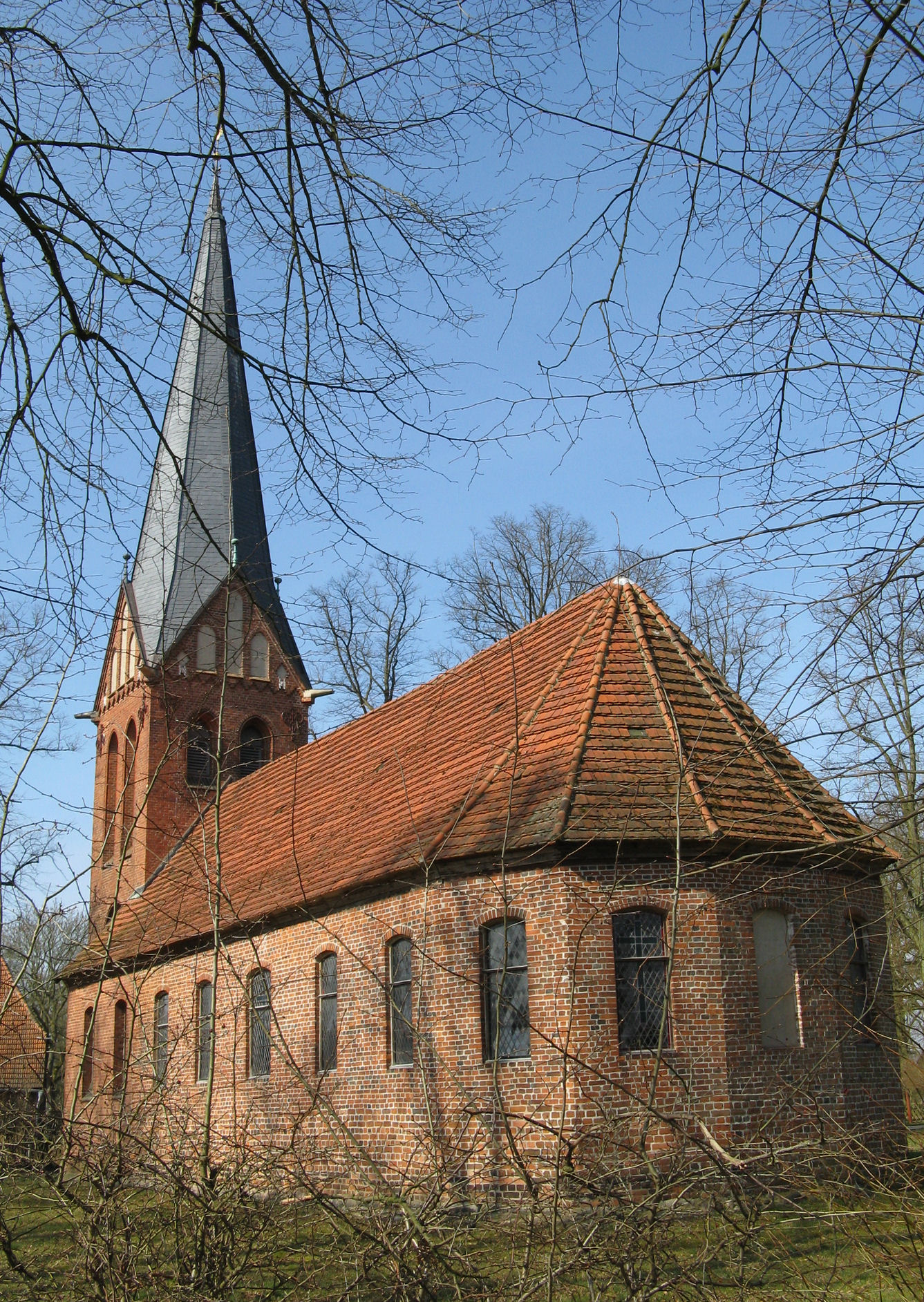
- Church in Uelitz

- Coat of arms

- Location of Uelitz within Ludwigslust-Parchim district
- Interactive map of Uelitz
- Location within Germany Location within Mecklenburg-Vorpommern
- Coordinates: 53°28′N 11°25′E
- Country: Germany
- State: Mecklenburg-Vorpommern
- District: Ludwigslust-Parchim
- Municipal assoc.: Ludwigslust-Land

Government
  - Mayor: Klaus-Otto Meyer

Area
  - Total: 15.04 km^{2} (5.81 sq mi)
- Elevation: 42 m (138 ft)

Population (2025-12-31)
  - Total: 475
  - Density: 31.6/km^{2} (81.8/sq mi)
- Time zone: UTC+01:00 (CET)
  - Summer (DST): UTC+02:00 (CEST)
- Postal codes: 19077
- Dialling codes: 03868
- Vehicle registration: LWL
- Website: www.amt- ludwigslust-land.de

Uelitz is a municipality in the Ludwigslust-Parchim district, in Mecklenburg-Vorpommern, Germany.
