= Siegfried Wustrow =

German cyclist (1936–2023)

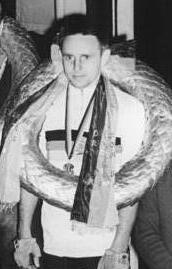
- Wustrow at the podium of the national championships in 1961

Personal information
- Born: 7 May 1936 Göhlen, Germany
- Died: 26 November 2023 (aged 87)

Sport
- Sport: Cycling
Medal record
Representing East Germany
UCI Motor-paced World Championships
Silver medal – second place	1960 Leipzig	Amateurs
Silver medal – second place	1961 Zurich	Amateurs

Siegfried Wustrow (7 May 1936 – 26 November 2023) was a German cyclist. He began his career in the early 1950s as an all-rounder, competing in road and cross-country races. However, he had his best achievements in motor-paced racing, winning two silver medals at the UCI Motor-paced World Championships in 1960 and 1961 and the national title in 1961.

After retirement he operated a taxi company in Leipzig and was organizing cycling events.
