= Ludwigslust-Land =

Amt in Mecklenburg-Vorpommern, Germany

- Amt
- Map of Ludwigslust-Parchim highlighting Ludwigslust-Land
- Interactive map of Ludwigslust-Land
- Location within Germany Location within Mecklenburg-Vorpommern
- Coordinates: 53°20′N 11°24′E
- Country: Germany
- State: Mecklenburg-Vorpommern
- District: Ludwigslust-Parchim
- Seat: Ludwigslust
- Subdivisions: 11 municipalities

Area
  - Total: 275.28 km^{2} (106.29 sq mi)

Population (2025-12-31)
  - Total: 8,250
  - Density: 30.0/km^{2} (77.6/sq mi)
- Time zone: UTC+01:00 (CET)
  - Summer (DST): UTC+02:00 (CEST)
- Website: www.amt-ludwigslust-land.de

Ludwigslust-Land is an Amt in the Ludwigslust-Parchim district, in Mecklenburg-Vorpommern, Germany. The seat of the Amt is in Ludwigslust, itself not part of the Amt.

The Amt Ludwigslust-Land consists of the following municipalities:

1. Alt Krenzlin
2. Bresegard bei Eldena
3. Göhlen
4. Groß Laasch
5. Lübesse
6. Lüblow
7. Rastow
8. Sülstorf
9. Uelitz
10. Warlow
11. Wöbbelin
