= Rastow =

- Municipality
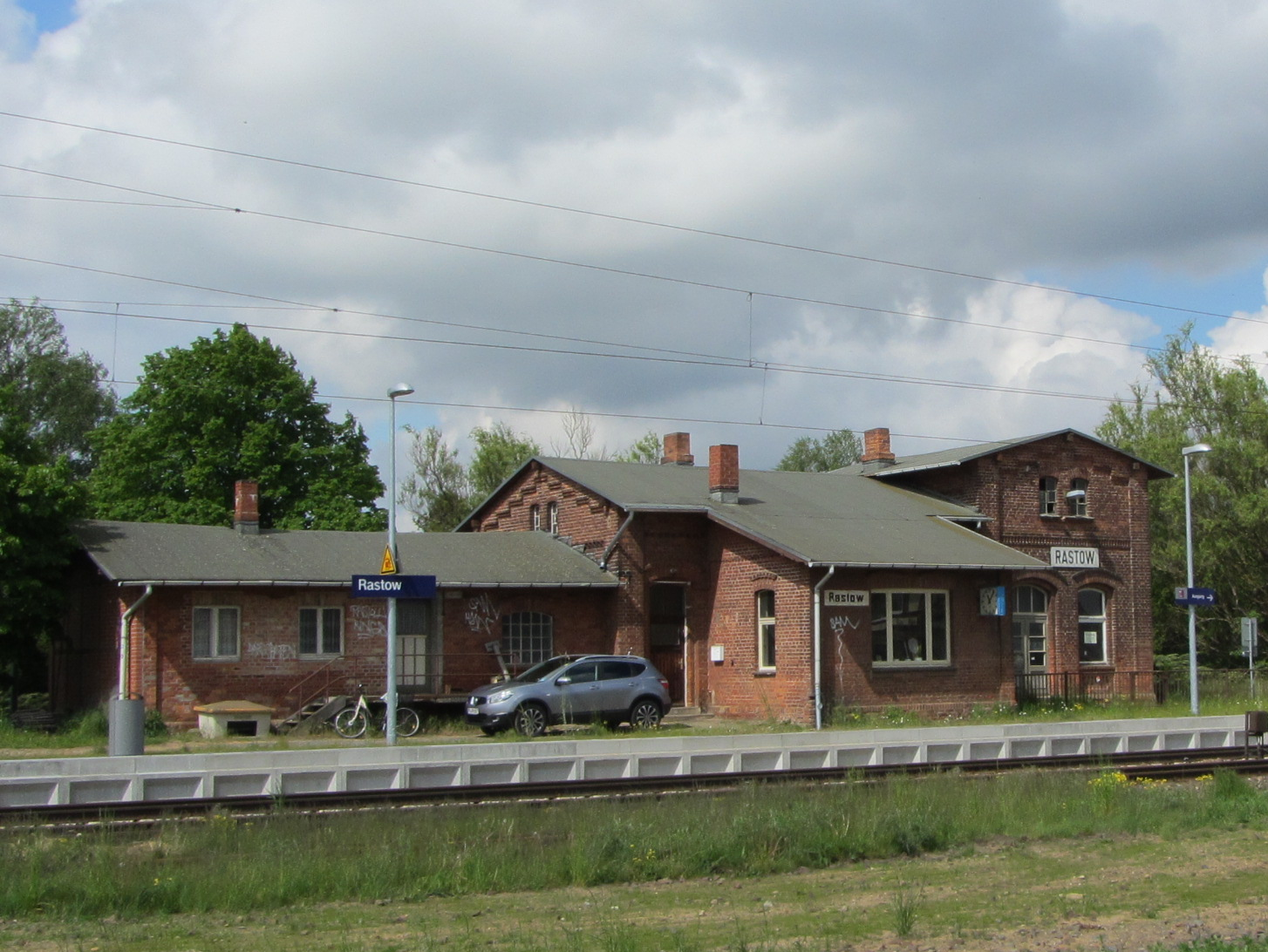
- Train station in Rastow

- Coat of arms

- Location of Rastow within Ludwigslust-Parchim district
- Interactive map of Rastow
- Location within Germany Location within Mecklenburg-Vorpommern
- Coordinates: 53°27′N 11°25′E
- Country: Germany
- State: Mecklenburg-Vorpommern
- District: Ludwigslust-Parchim
- Municipal assoc.: Ludwigslust-Land
- Subdivisions: 5

Government
  - Mayor: Hartmut Götze

Area
  - Total: 51.66 km^{2} (19.95 sq mi)
- Elevation: 38 m (125 ft)

Population (2025-12-31)
  - Total: 1,915
  - Density: 37.07/km^{2} (96.01/sq mi)
- Time zone: UTC+01:00 (CET)
  - Summer (DST): UTC+02:00 (CEST)
- Postal codes: 19077
- Dialling codes: 03868
- Vehicle registration: LWL
- Website: www.amt-ludwigslust-land.de

Rastow is a municipality in the Ludwigslust-Parchim district, in Mecklenburg-Vorpommern, Germany.
