= Dömitz-Malliß =

- Amt
- Map of Ludwigslust-Parchim highlighting Dömitz-Malliß
- Interactive map of Dömitz-Malliß
- Location within Germany Location within Mecklenburg-Vorpommern
- Coordinates: 53°13′N 11°19′E
- Country: Germany
- State: Mecklenburg-Vorpommern
- District: Ludwigslust-Parchim
- Seat: Dömitz
- Subdivisions: 7 municipalities

Area
  - Total: 258.33 km^{2} (99.74 sq mi)

Population (2025-12-31)
  - Total: 8,159
  - Density: 31.58/km^{2} (81.80/sq mi)
- Time zone: UTC+01:00 (CET)
  - Summer (DST): UTC+02:00 (CEST)
- Website: www.amtdoemitz-malliss.de

Dömitz-Malliß is an Amt in the Ludwigslust-Parchim district, in Mecklenburg-Vorpommern, Germany. The seat of the Amt is in Dömitz.

The Amt Dömitz-Malliß consists of the following municipalities:

- Dömitz
- Grebs-Niendorf
- Karenz
- Malk Göhren
- Malliß
- Neu Kaliß
- Vielank
