= Lübesse =

- Municipality
- Coat of arms

- Location of Lübesse within Ludwigslust-Parchim district
- Interactive map of Lübesse
- Location within Germany Location within Mecklenburg-Vorpommern
- Coordinates: 53°28′N 11°28′E
- Country: Germany
- State: Mecklenburg-Vorpommern
- District: Ludwigslust-Parchim
- Municipal assoc.: Ludwigslust-Land
- Subdivisions: 3

Government
  - Mayor: Reinhold Kunze

Area
  - Total: 19.93 km^{2} (7.70 sq mi)
- Elevation: 42 m (138 ft)

Population (2025-12-31)
  - Total: 684
  - Density: 34.3/km^{2} (88.9/sq mi)
- Time zone: UTC+01:00 (CET)
  - Summer (DST): UTC+02:00 (CEST)
- Postal codes: 19077
- Dialling codes: 03868
- Vehicle registration: LWL
- Website: www.gemeinde-luebesse.de

Lübesse is a municipality in the Ludwigslust-Parchim district, in Mecklenburg-Vorpommern, Germany.
