= Grebs-Niendorf =

- Municipality
- Location of Grebs-Niendorf within Ludwigslust-Parchim district
- Interactive map of Grebs-Niendorf
- Location within Germany Location within Mecklenburg-Vorpommern
- Coordinates: 53°15′N 11°18′E
- Country: Germany
- State: Mecklenburg-Vorpommern
- District: Ludwigslust-Parchim
- Municipal assoc.: Dömitz-Malliß

Government
  - Mayor: Detlef Schranck

Area
  - Total: 31.17 km^{2} (12.03 sq mi)
- Elevation: 21 m (69 ft)

Population (2025-12-31)
  - Total: 537
  - Density: 17.2/km^{2} (44.6/sq mi)
- Time zone: UTC+01:00 (CET)
  - Summer (DST): UTC+02:00 (CEST)
- Postal codes: 19294
- Dialling codes: 038750, 038754
- Vehicle registration: LWL
- Website: www.amtdoemitz-malliss.de

Grebs-Niendorf is a municipality in the Ludwigslust-Parchim district, in Mecklenburg-Vorpommern, Germany.
