= Kuhstorf =

- Municipality
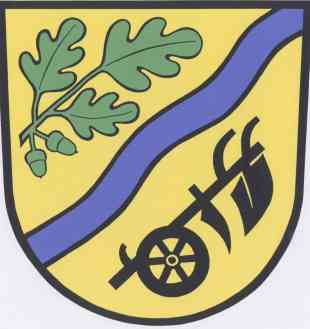
- Coat of arms

- Location of Kuhstorf within Ludwigslust-Parchim district
- Interactive map of Kuhstorf
- Location within Germany Location within Mecklenburg-Vorpommern
- Coordinates: 53°22′N 11°14′E
- Country: Germany
- State: Mecklenburg-Vorpommern
- District: Ludwigslust-Parchim
- Municipal assoc.: Hagenow-Land
- Subdivisions: 2

Government
  - Mayor: Rudolf Kuhla

Area
  - Total: 15.02 km^{2} (5.80 sq mi)
- Elevation: 19 m (62 ft)

Population (2025-12-31)
  - Total: 688
  - Density: 45.8/km^{2} (119/sq mi)
- Time zone: UTC+01:00 (CET)
  - Summer (DST): UTC+02:00 (CEST)
- Postal codes: 19230
- Dialling codes: 03883
- Vehicle registration: LWL
- Website: www.amt-hagenow-land.de

Kuhstorf is a municipality in the Ludwigslust-Parchim district, in Mecklenburg-Vorpommern, Germany.
