= Leussow =

- Ortsteil of Göhlen
- Interactive map of Leussow
- Location within Germany Location within Mecklenburg-Vorpommern
- Coordinates: 53°16′N 11°16′E
- Country: Germany
- State: Mecklenburg-Vorpommern
- District: Ludwigslust-Parchim
- Municipality: Göhlen
- Subdivisions: 2

Area
  - Total: 19.93 km^{2} (7.70 sq mi)
- Elevation: 21 m (69 ft)

Population (2017-12-31)
  - Total: 248
  - Density: 12.4/km^{2} (32.2/sq mi)
- Time zone: UTC+01:00 (CET)
  - Summer (DST): UTC+02:00 (CEST)
- Postal codes: 19288
- Dialling codes: 038754
- Vehicle registration: LWL
- Website: www.amt-ludwigslust-land.de

Leussow is a village and a former municipality in the Ludwigslust-Parchim district, in Mecklenburg-Vorpommern, Germany. Since May 2019, it is part of the municipality Göhlen.
