= Vielank =

- Municipality
- Location of Vielank within Ludwigslust-Parchim district
- Interactive map of Vielank
- Location within Germany Location within Mecklenburg-Vorpommern
- Coordinates: 53°13′N 11°07′E
- Country: Germany
- State: Mecklenburg-Vorpommern
- District: Ludwigslust-Parchim
- Municipal assoc.: Dömitz-Malliß
- Subdivisions: 8

Government
  - Mayor: Christel Drewes

Area
  - Total: 77.38 km^{2} (29.88 sq mi)
- Elevation: 14 m (46 ft)

Population (2025-12-31)
  - Total: 1,250
  - Density: 16.2/km^{2} (41.8/sq mi)
- Time zone: UTC+01:00 (CET)
  - Summer (DST): UTC+02:00 (CEST)
- Postal codes: 19303
- Dialling codes: 038759
- Vehicle registration: LWL
- Website: www.amtdoemitz-malliss.de

Vielank is a municipality in the Ludwigslust-Parchim district, in Mecklenburg-Vorpommern, Germany.
