= Warlow =

- Municipality
- Location of Warlow within Ludwigslust-Parchim district
- Interactive map of Warlow
- Location within Germany Location within Mecklenburg-Vorpommern
- Coordinates: 53°20′N 11°24′E
- Country: Germany
- State: Mecklenburg-Vorpommern
- District: Ludwigslust-Parchim
- Municipal assoc.: Ludwigslust-Land

Government
  - Mayor: Rainer Zimmermann

Area
  - Total: 13.85 km^{2} (5.35 sq mi)
- Elevation: 32 m (105 ft)

Population (2025-12-31)
  - Total: 478
  - Density: 34.5/km^{2} (89.4/sq mi)
- Time zone: UTC+01:00 (CET)
  - Summer (DST): UTC+02:00 (CEST)
- Postal codes: 19288
- Dialling codes: 03874, 038751
- Vehicle registration: LWL
- Website: www.amt-ludwigslust-land.de

Warlow is a municipality in the Ludwigslust-Parchim district, in Mecklenburg-Vorpommern, Germany.
