= Göhlen =

- Municipality
- Interactive map of Göhlen
- Location within Germany Location within Mecklenburg-Vorpommern
- Coordinates: 53°17′N 11°22′E
- Country: Germany
- State: Mecklenburg-Vorpommern
- District: Ludwigslust-Parchim
- Municipal assoc.: Ludwigslust-Land

Government
  - Mayor: Helmut Seyer

Area
  - Total: 34.02 km^{2} (13.14 sq mi)
- Elevation: 20 m (66 ft)

Population (2025-12-31)
  - Total: 530
  - Density: 16/km^{2} (40/sq mi)
- Time zone: UTC+01:00 (CET)
  - Summer (DST): UTC+02:00 (CEST)
- Postal codes: 19288
- Dialling codes: 038751
- Vehicle registration: LWL
- Website: www.amt-ludwigslust-land.de

Göhlen (German pronunciation: [ˈɡøːlən]) is a municipality in the Ludwigslust-Parchim district, in Mecklenburg-Vorpommern, Germany. The former municipality Leussow was merged into Göhlen in May 2019.

== Notable people ==
- Siegfried Wustrow (1936–2023), cyclist
