= Alt Krenzlin =

- Municipality
- Location of Alt Krenzlin within Ludwigslust-Parchim district
- Interactive map of Alt Krenzlin
- Location within Germany Location within Mecklenburg-Vorpommern
- Coordinates: 53°18′N 11°17′E
- Country: Germany
- State: Mecklenburg-Vorpommern
- District: Ludwigslust-Parchim
- Municipal assoc.: Ludwigslust-Land
- Subdivisions: 5 Ortsteile

Government
  - Mayor: Kersten Schmidt (SPD)

Area
  - Total: 37.57 km^{2} (14.51 sq mi)
- Elevation: 54 m (177 ft)

Population (2025-12-31)
  - Total: 730
  - Density: 19/km^{2} (50/sq mi)
- Time zone: UTC+01:00 (CET)
  - Summer (DST): UTC+02:00 (CEST)
- Postal codes: 19288
- Dialling codes: 038751, 038754
- Vehicle registration: LUP, HGN, LBZ, LWL, PCH, STB
- Website: www.amt-ludwigslust-land.de

Alt Krenzlin is a municipality in the Ludwigslust-Parchim district, in Mecklenburg-Vorpommern, Germany.
