= Steesow =

- Ortsteil of Grabow
- Interactive map of Steesow
- Location within Germany Location within Mecklenburg-Vorpommern
- Coordinates: 53°09′31″N 11°32′39″E
- Country: Germany
- State: Mecklenburg-Vorpommern
- District: Ludwigslust-Parchim
- Town: Grabow
- Subdivisions: 3

Area
  - Total: 24.40 km^{2} (9.42 sq mi)
- Elevation: 36 m (118 ft)

Population (2014-12-31)
  - Total: 197
  - Density: 8.07/km^{2} (20.9/sq mi)
- Time zone: UTC+01:00 (CET)
  - Summer (DST): UTC+02:00 (CEST)
- Postal codes: 19300
- Dialling codes: 038781, 038792
- Vehicle registration: LWL, LUP
- Website: www.amt-grabow.de

Steesow is a village and ortsteil as well as a former municipality. Until 1 January 2016, Steesow was a municipality in the Amt Grabow that consisted of 3 subdivisions, or ortsteile, those being the villages of Bochin and Zuggelrade as well as the settlement of Steesow itself. Since its annexation into the town of Grabow in 2016 however, Steesow is now administratively separate from its former subdivisions which have all become ortsteile of Grabow. Along with its former subdivisions, Steesow is an exclave of Grabow, a municipality in the Ludwigslust-Parchim district, in Mecklenburg-Vorpommern, Germany.
