= Neu Kaliß =

- Municipality
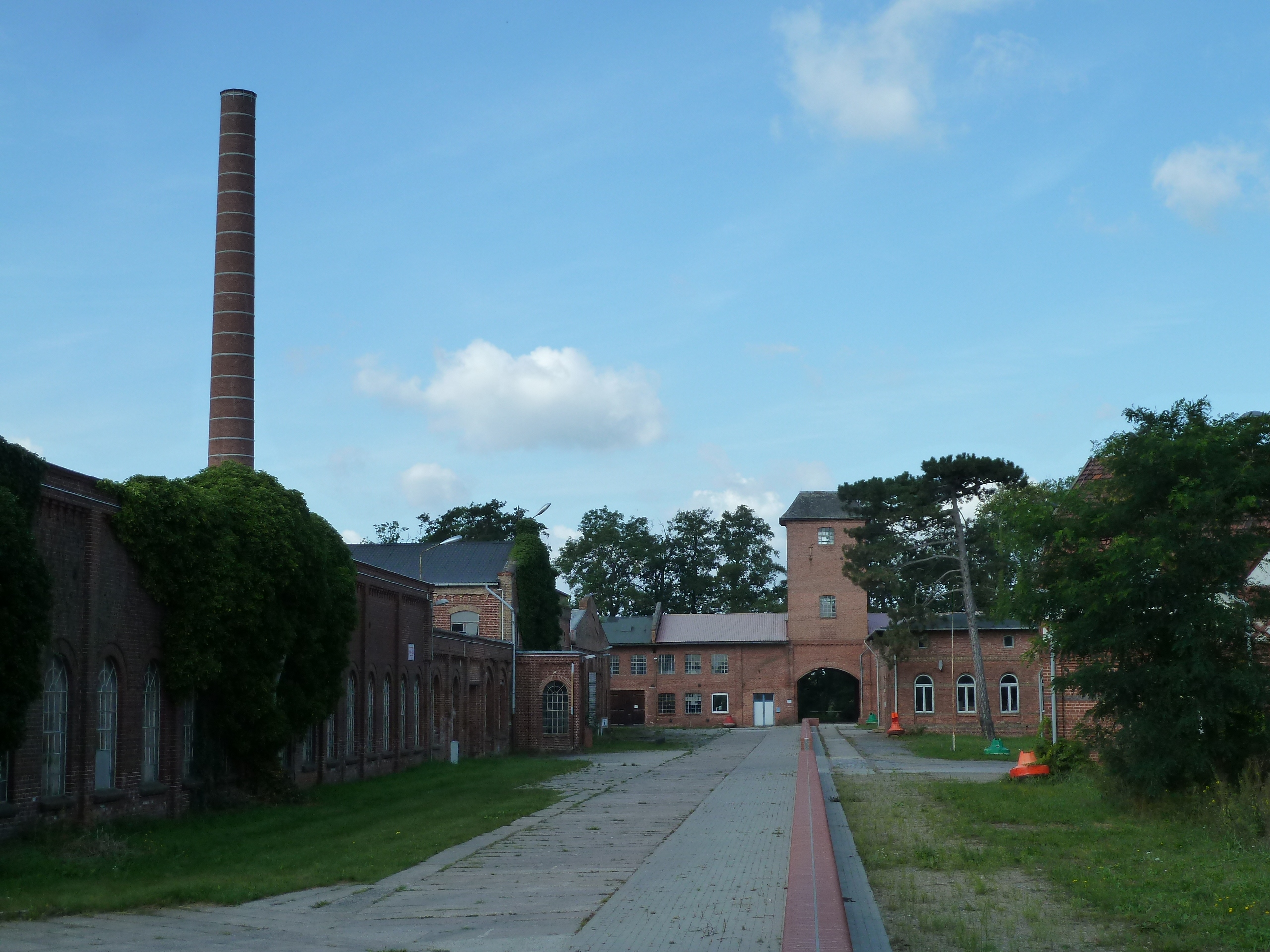
- Factory of Felix Schoeller & Bausch in Neu Kaliß

- Location of Neu Kaliß within Ludwigslust-Parchim district
- Interactive map of Neu Kaliß
- Location within Germany Location within Mecklenburg-Vorpommern
- Coordinates: 53°10′N 11°16′E
- Country: Germany
- State: Mecklenburg-Vorpommern
- District: Ludwigslust-Parchim
- Municipal assoc.: Dömitz-Malliß
- Subdivisions: 4

Government
  - Mayor: Burkhard Thees

Area
  - Total: 34.05 km^{2} (13.15 sq mi)
- Elevation: 16 m (52 ft)

Population (2025-12-31)
  - Total: 1,853
  - Density: 54.42/km^{2} (140.9/sq mi)
- Time zone: UTC+01:00 (CET)
  - Summer (DST): UTC+02:00 (CEST)
- Postal codes: 19294
- Dialling codes: 038758
- Vehicle registration: LWL
- Website: www.amtdoemitz-malliss.de

Neu Kaliß is a municipality in the Ludwigslust-Parchim district, in Mecklenburg-Vorpommern, Germany.
