= Malliß =

- Municipality
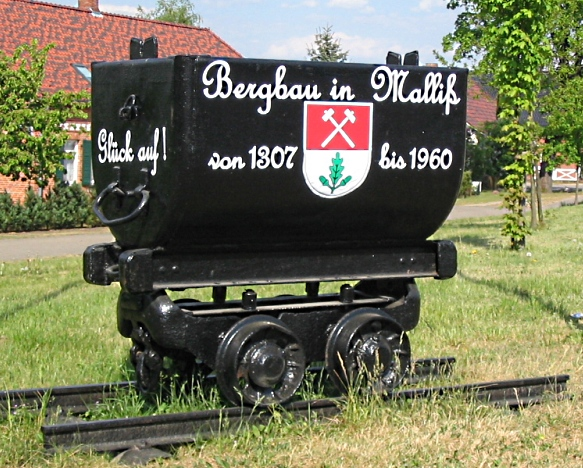
- Former lignite mine in Malliß

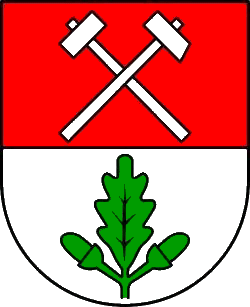
- Coat of arms

- Location of Malliß within Ludwigslust-Parchim district
- Interactive map of Malliß
- Location within Germany Location within Mecklenburg-Vorpommern
- Coordinates: 53°13′N 11°19′E
- Country: Germany
- State: Mecklenburg-Vorpommern
- District: Ludwigslust-Parchim
- Municipal assoc.: Dömitz-Malliß
- Subdivisions: 5

Government
  - Mayor: Wolfgang Hahn

Area
  - Total: 25.17 km^{2} (9.72 sq mi)
- Elevation: 41 m (135 ft)

Population (2025-12-31)
  - Total: 1,098
  - Density: 43.62/km^{2} (113.0/sq mi)
- Time zone: UTC+01:00 (CET)
  - Summer (DST): UTC+02:00 (CEST)
- Postal codes: 19294
- Dialling codes: 038750
- Vehicle registration: LWL
- Website: www.malliss.de

Malliß is a municipality in the Ludwigslust-Parchim district, in Mecklenburg-Vorpommern, Germany.
