= Karenz =

- Municipality
- Location of Karenz within Ludwigslust-Parchim district
- Interactive map of Karenz
- Location within Germany Location within Mecklenburg-Vorpommern
- Coordinates: 53°13′N 11°20′E
- Country: Germany
- State: Mecklenburg-Vorpommern
- District: Ludwigslust-Parchim
- Municipal assoc.: Dömitz-Malliß

Government
  - Mayor: Wilfried Pagung

Area
  - Total: 6.83 km^{2} (2.64 sq mi)
- Elevation: 50 m (160 ft)

Population (2025-12-31)
  - Total: 212
  - Density: 31.0/km^{2} (80.4/sq mi)
- Time zone: UTC+01:00 (CET)
  - Summer (DST): UTC+02:00 (CEST)
- Postal codes: 19294
- Dialling codes: 038750
- Vehicle registration: LWL
- Website: www.amtdoemitz-malliss.de

Karenz is a municipality in the Ludwigslust-Parchim district, in Mecklenburg-Vorpommern, Germany.
