= Gemarkung =

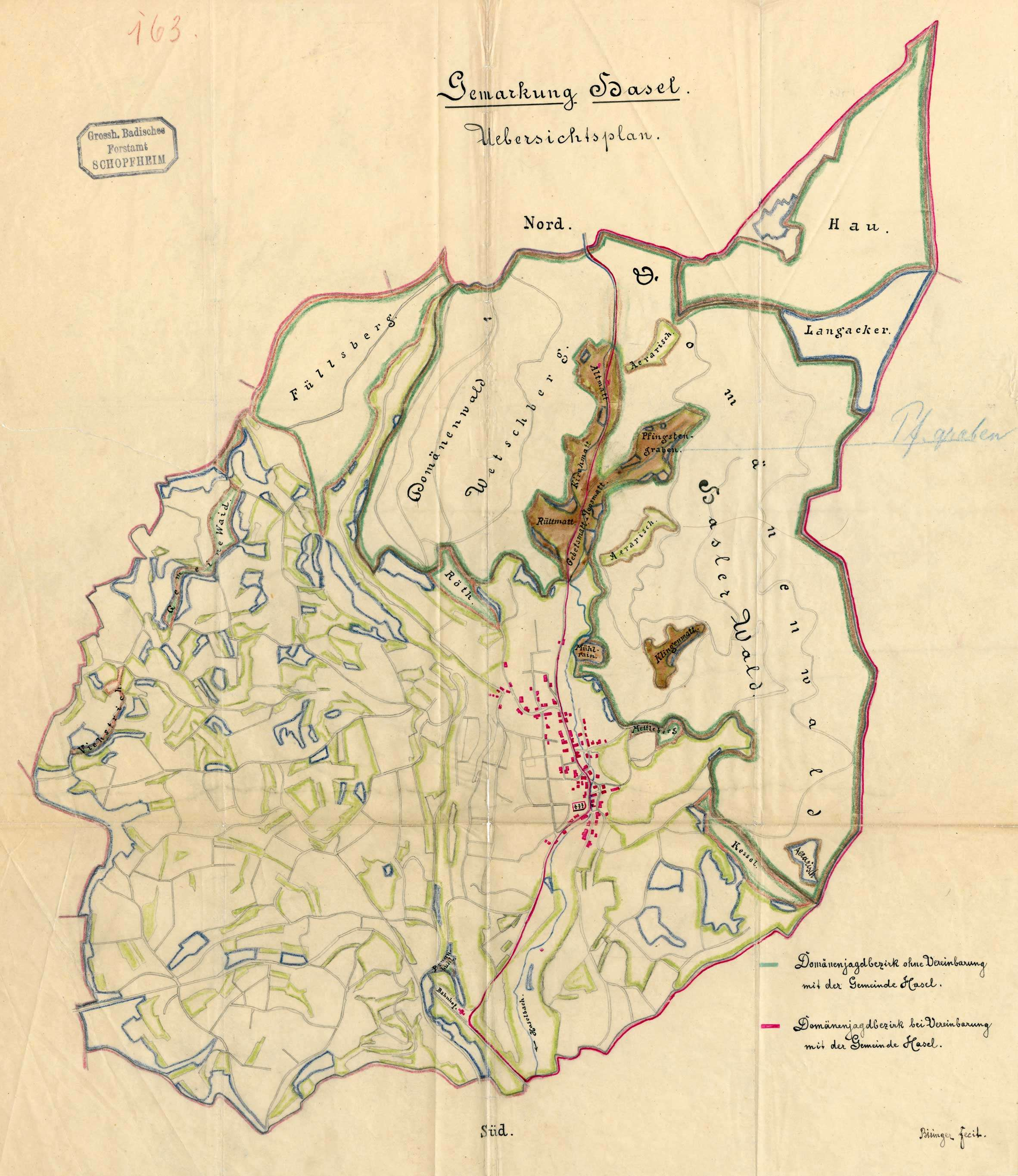
Map of the Gemarkung of the German municipality Hasel in the Grand Duchy of Baden in 1904, showing a proposed land swap between the local Domänenjagdbezirk (roughly: state hunting district) and the Gemeindejagdbezirk (municipal hunting district)

A Gemarkung (German pronunciation: [ɡəˈmaʁkʊŋ]; also Markung, in Switzerland also Gemarchen) is the entirety of all land plots of a specific municipality, or a specific large part of a municipality, recorded in the cadastre in the countries of Germany and Switzerland (For an equivalent concept in Austria and adjacent countries see Katastralgemeinde).

Gemarkung may be variously translated into English as: district, cadastral district, local subdistrict, cadastral area, tithing, township, parish, section of a community area

Gemarkung registers record the parcels' location, usage and geomorphology and the like qualities, however, the rights to the land (as property, or collateral liened by a mortgage) are kept in the Grundbuch (land register). A Gemarkung is made up of a number of, usually contiguous, plots of land/parcels (Flurstücke). In many cases, several "Flurstücke" are grouped together to form a Flur, usually a tract of open land or forest. In sum, the sequence of the three subdivisions is: Gemarkung - Flur - Flurstück.
