= Bresegard bei Eldena =

- Municipality
- Location of Bresegard bei Eldena within Ludwigslust-Parchim district
- Interactive map of Bresegard bei Eldena
- Location within Germany Location within Mecklenburg-Vorpommern
- Coordinates: 53°14′50″N 11°22′9″E
- Country: Germany
- State: Mecklenburg-Vorpommern
- District: Ludwigslust-Parchim
- Municipal assoc.: Ludwigslust-Land
- Subdivisions: 2

Government
  - Mayor: Heike Romann

Area
  - Total: 10.92 km^{2} (4.22 sq mi)
- Elevation: 23 m (75 ft)

Population (2025-12-31)
  - Total: 189
  - Density: 17.3/km^{2} (44.8/sq mi)
- Time zone: UTC+01:00 (CET)
  - Summer (DST): UTC+02:00 (CEST)
- Postal codes: 19294
- Dialling codes: 038755
- Vehicle registration: LWL
- Website: www.amt-ludwigslust-land.de

Bresegard bei Eldena is a municipality in the Ludwigslust-Parchim district, in Mecklenburg-Vorpommern, Germany.
