= List of rivers of Mecklenburg-Vorpommern =

A list of rivers of Mecklenburg-Vorpommern, Germany:

== A ==
- Aubach
- Augraben, tributary of the Nebel
- Augraben, tributary of the Tollense

== B ==
- Barthe
- Beke
- Bietnitz
- Boize
- Brebowbach
- Bresenitz
- Brüeler Bach

== D ==
- Datze
- Delvenau
- Dollbek
- Drosedower Bek
- Duwenbeek

== E ==
- Elbe
- Elde

== G ==
- Gadebuscher Bach
- Gehlsbach
- Goldbach
- Göwe
- Groote Beek
- Großer Landgraben
- Grube

== H ==
- Hanshäger Bach
- Harkenbäk
- Havel

== K ==
- Kleine Sude
- Kleiner Landgraben
- Kösterbeck
- Krainke
- Küstriner Bach

== L ==
- Landgraben
- Linde
- Löcknitz
- Lößnitz

== M ==
- Maurine
- Meynbach
- Mildenitz
- Moosterbach
- Motel, tributary of the Schilde
- Motel, tributary of the Warnow
- Mützelburger Beeke

== N ==
- Nebel
- Nonne

== O ==
- Oberbek
- Oder

== P ==
- Peene
- Peenestrom

== R ==
- Radegast
- Randow
- Recknitz
- Rögnitz
- Ryck

== S ==
- Schaale
- Schilde
- Schillerbach
- Schmaar
- Schwinge
- Stege
- Steinbach
- Stendlitz
- Stepenitz
- Stör
- Sude

== T ==
- Tarnitz
- Temse
- Tiene
- Tollense
- Trebel

== U ==
- Uecker
- Unterwarnow

== W ==
- Waidbach
- Wakenitz
- Warbel
- Warnow
- Wocker

== Z ==
- Zare
- Zarnow
- Zarow
- Ziemenbach
- Ziese
