= Augraben =

Augraben may refer to:

- Augraben (Liederbach), river in Hesse, Germany, tributary of the Liederbach
- Augraben (Nebel), river in Mecklenburg-Vorpommern, Germany, tributary of the Nebel
- Augraben (Tollense), river in Mecklenburg-Vorpommern, Germany, tributary of the Tollense
