= Lößnitz (Nebel) =

River in Germany

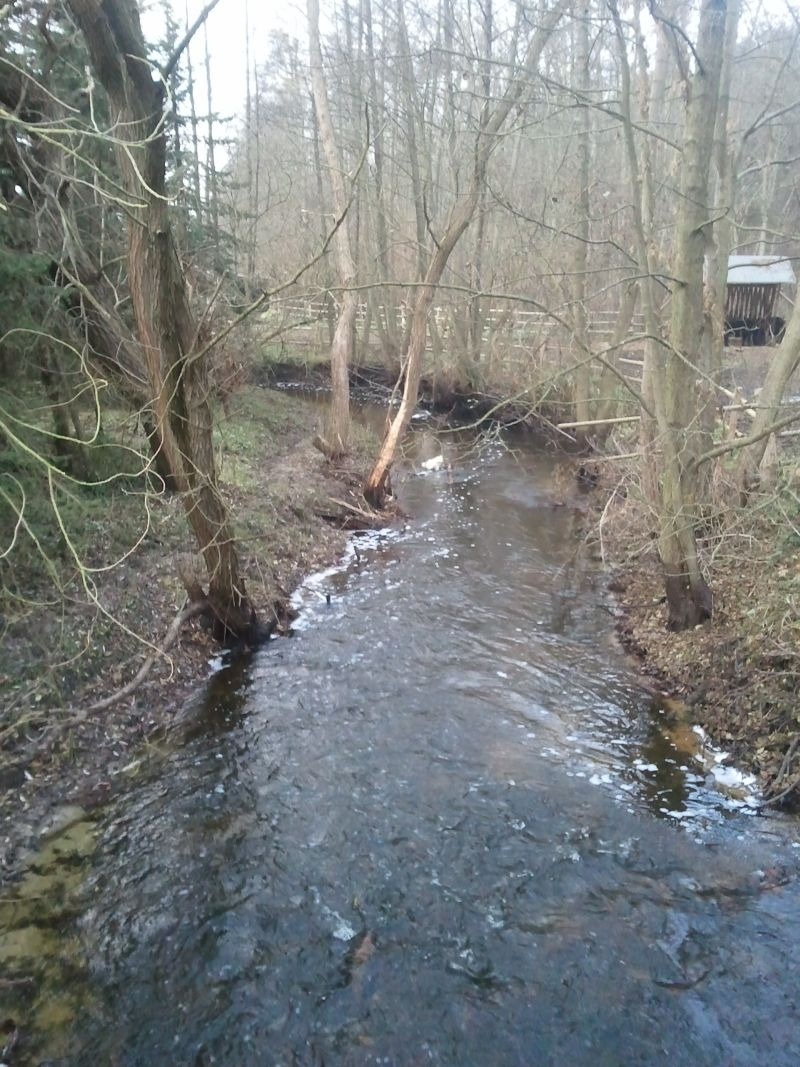

Location
- Country: Germany
- States: Mecklenburg-Vorpommern

Physical characteristics
- Mouth
  - location: Nebel
  - coordinates: 53.7822°N 12.2424°E

Basin features
- Progression: Nebel→ Warnow→ Baltic Sea

Lößnitz is a river of Mecklenburg-Vorpommern, Germany. It is a right tributary of the Nebel.

== See also ==
- List of rivers of Mecklenburg-Vorpommern
