= Gehlsbach (river) =

River in Germany

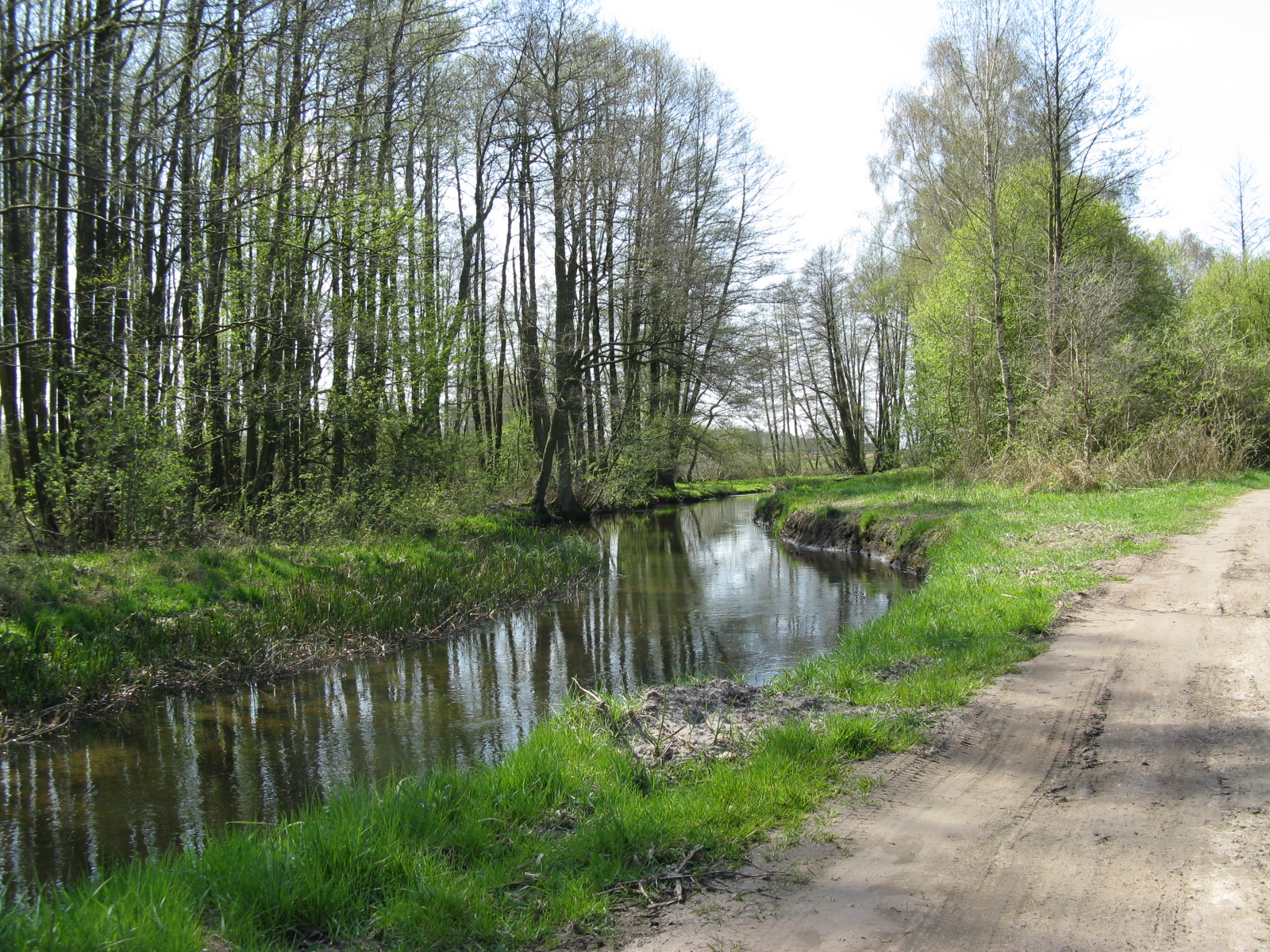

Location
- Country: Germany
- States: Mecklenburg-Vorpommern

Physical characteristics
- Source
  - location: west of Ganzlin
  - elevation: 74.7 m (245 ft)
- Mouth
  - location: Elde, east of Siggelkow
  - coordinates: 53.3897°N 11.9828°E
  - elevation: 46.1 m (151 ft)
- Length: 23.5 km (14.6 mi)

Basin features
- Progression: Elde→ Elbe→ North Sea
- Tributaries
  - left: Seegraben, Basnisbach

Gehlsbach is a river of Mecklenburg-Vorpommern, Germany. It is a tributary of the Elde.

== See also ==
- List of rivers of Mecklenburg-Vorpommern
