= Moosterbach =

River in Germany

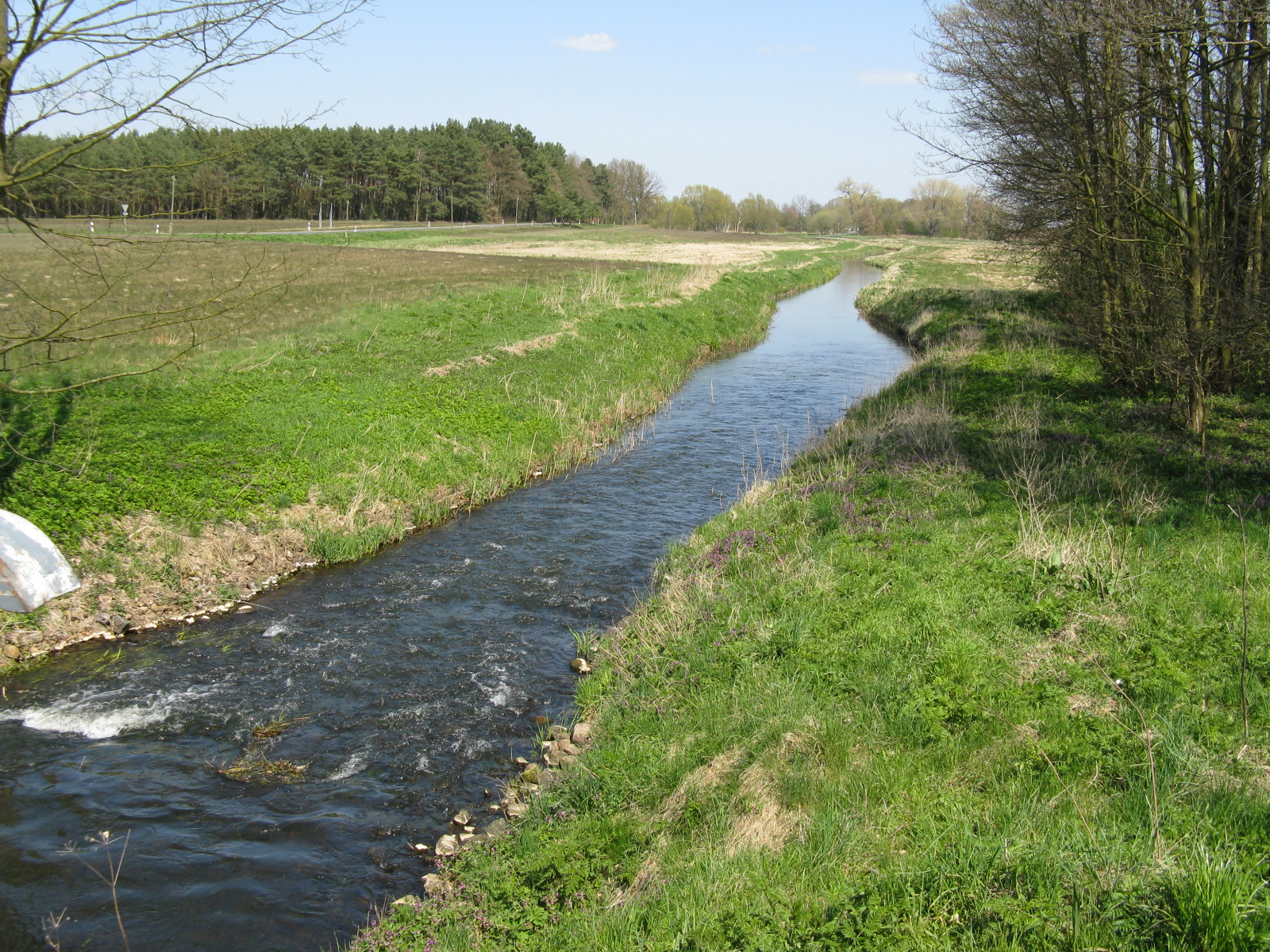

Location
- Country: Germany
- States: Mecklenburg-Vorpommern

Physical characteristics
- Mouth
  - location: Elde
  - coordinates: 53.3891°N 11.9763°E

Basin features
- Progression: Elde→ Elbe→ North Sea

Moosterbach is a river of Mecklenburg-Vorpommern, Germany. It flows into a branch of the Elde near Siggelkow.

== See also ==
- List of rivers of Mecklenburg-Vorpommern
