= Rom, Germany =

Rom
- Municipality
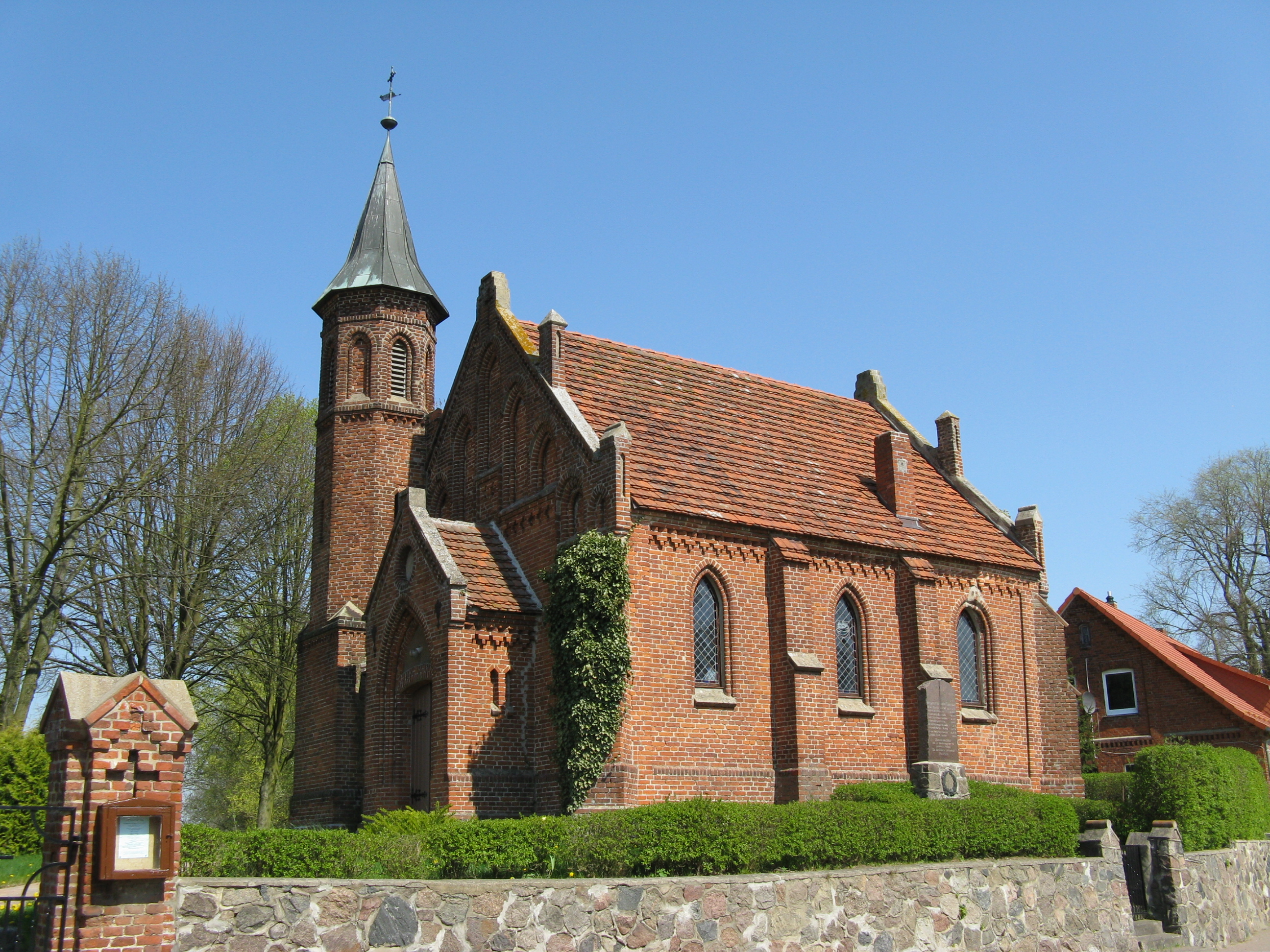
- Church in Paarsch

- Location of Rom within Ludwigslust-Parchim district
- Interactive map of Rom
- Location within Germany Location within Mecklenburg-Vorpommern
- Coordinates: 53°27′N 11°55′E
- Country: Germany
- State: Mecklenburg-Vorpommern
- District: Ludwigslust-Parchim
- Municipal assoc.: Parchimer Umland
- Subdivisions: 6

Government
  - Mayor: Horst Klawuhn

Area
  - Total: 33.71 km^{2} (13.02 sq mi)
- Elevation: 58 m (190 ft)

Population (2025-12-31)
  - Total: 807
  - Density: 23.9/km^{2} (62.0/sq mi)
- Time zone: UTC+01:00 (CET)
  - Summer (DST): UTC+02:00 (CEST)
- Postal codes: 19372
- Dialling codes: 038731
- Vehicle registration: PCH
- Website: www.amt-parchimer-umland.de

Rom (German pronunciation: [ʁoːm]) is a municipality in the Ludwigslust-Parchim district, in Mecklenburg-Vorpommern, Germany.

== Geography and transport ==
The municipality is located 7 km east of Parchim and seven kilometers west of Lübz. The Bundesstraße 191 runs through the community. The Bundesautobahn 24 can be reached via the Parchim junction, which is 18 km away from Rom. The municipality is bordered by the Müritz-Elde waterway in the south. The Darzer Hochmoor and the Wockertal are found in the northern part. Rom had a stop on the Mecklenburg Southern Railway, the Haltepunkt Rom (Meckl).

The municipality of Rom includes the villages of Darze, Klein Niendorf, Lancken, Paarsch, Rome and Stralendorf.

== History ==
Lancken, as the oldest village of the municipality of Rom, was first mentioned in 1229 in a document. From a former Meierhof (around 1700) of the estate of Greven emerged an estate of the families of Hammerstein (from 1800) of Soden (1806), Knights of Henckel (after 1824) and of the families Blanck, Stucken and until 1945, Wesendorf. In 1830, the old manor house was demolished; under the Blanck family, the still existing mansion, a brick building with hipped roof, was completed in 1846. From 1960 onwards it served as a school, from 1984 onwards it was a children's holiday home, and it is now privately owned.

=== Name ===
Rom was called villa Rome in 1310, Roma in 1320, Rome in 1329, and Rohm in 1621. The name comes from the Polabian language and refers to the Lokator: Ort des Rom ("Rom's place").

=== Merger of municipalities ===
On January 1, 1951, Stralendorf was incorporated into Darze. On the same day, Lancken became part of the municipality of Rom.

On June 13, 2004, Stralendorf was incorporated into Rom.
