= Motel (Warnow) =

River in Germany

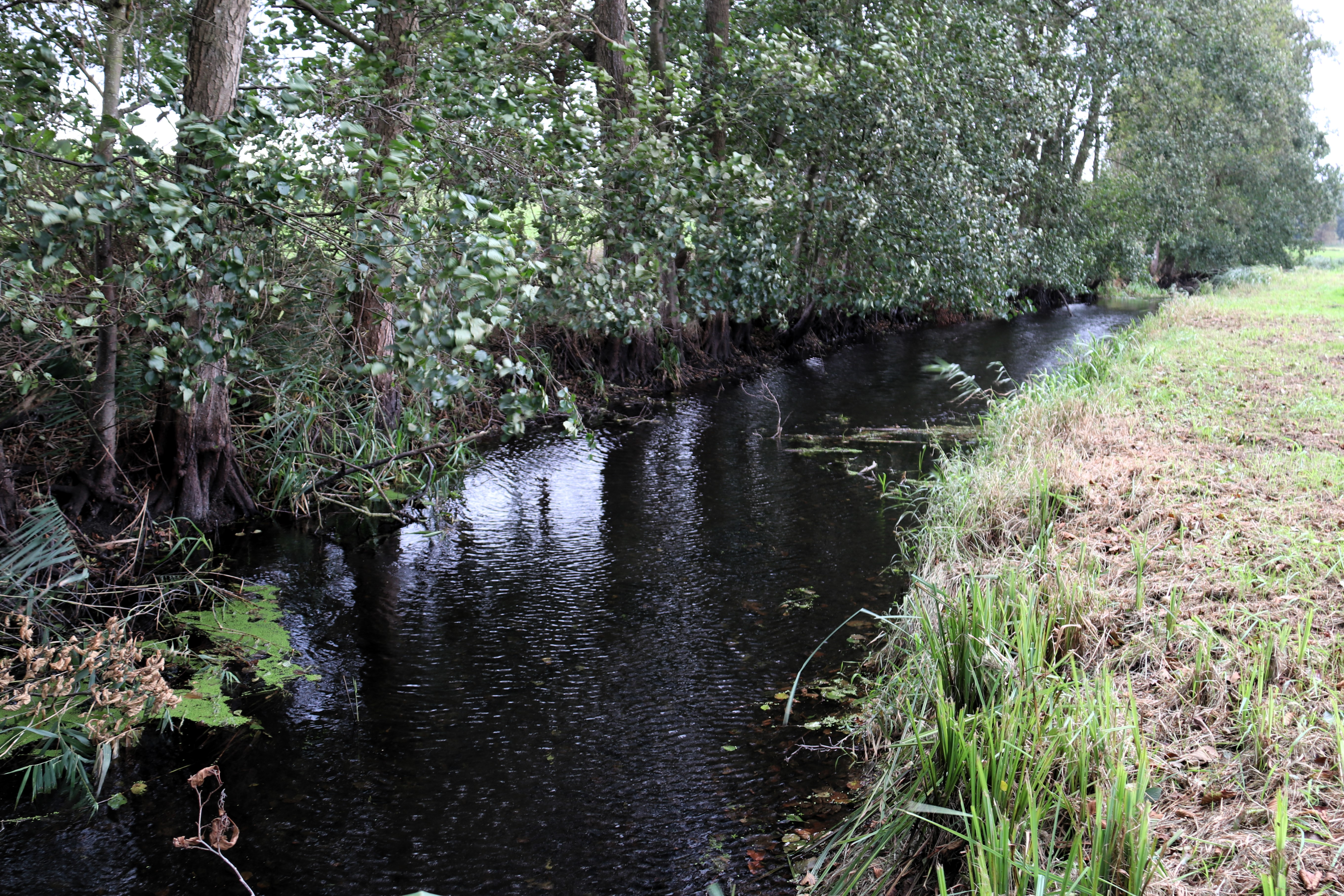

Location
- Country: Germany
- States: Mecklenburg-Vorpommern

Physical characteristics
- Mouth
  - location: Warnow
  - coordinates: 53.6451°N 11.5773°E

Basin features
- Progression: Warnow→ Baltic Sea

Motel is a river of Mecklenburg-Vorpommern, Germany. It is a left tributary of the Warnow.

== See also ==
- List of rivers of Mecklenburg-Vorpommern
