= Göwe =

River in Germany

Location
- Country: Germany
- States: Mecklenburg-Vorpommern

Physical characteristics
- Mouth
  - location: Warnow
  - coordinates: 53.6902°N 11.6160°E

Basin features
- Progression: Warnow→ Baltic Sea

Göwe is a river of Mecklenburg-Vorpommern, Germany. It flows into the Warnow near Kuhlen-Wendorf.

== Event ==
Around 1770, the course of the Göwe River was diverted around Lake Holzendorf; it was returned to its original course in 1969. These regulations and the associated lowering of the water level led to the accelerated silting up of the lake.

== See also ==
- List of rivers of Mecklenburg-Vorpommern
