= Zarnow =

Zarnow may refer to:

- Żarnów
- Gmina Żarnów
- Zarnow (river), a river in Germany
