= Bietnitz =

River in Germany

Location
- Country: Germany
- State: Mecklenburg-Vorpommern

Physical characteristics
- Mouth
  - location: Binnensee
  - coordinates: 53.6042°N 11.5527°E

Basin features
- Progression: Binnensee→ Warnow→ Baltic Sea

Bietnitz is a river of Mecklenburg-Vorpommern, Germany. It flows into the Binnensee in Pinnow. The Binnensee is drained via the Mühlensee and the Mühlenfließ to the Warnow.

== See also ==
- List of rivers of Mecklenburg-Vorpommern
