= Fresenbrügge =

- Ortsteil of Grabow
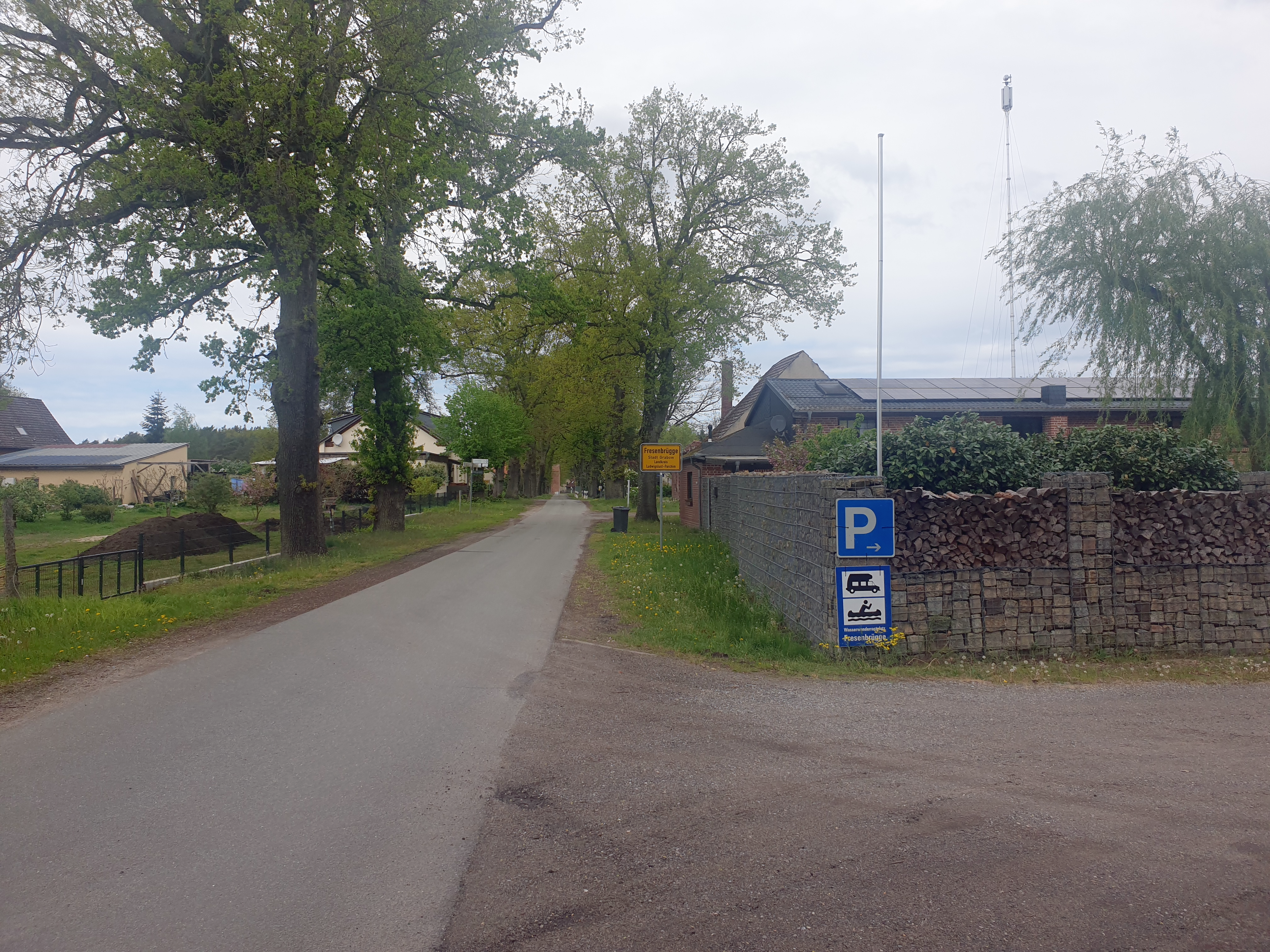
- Entrance into the village

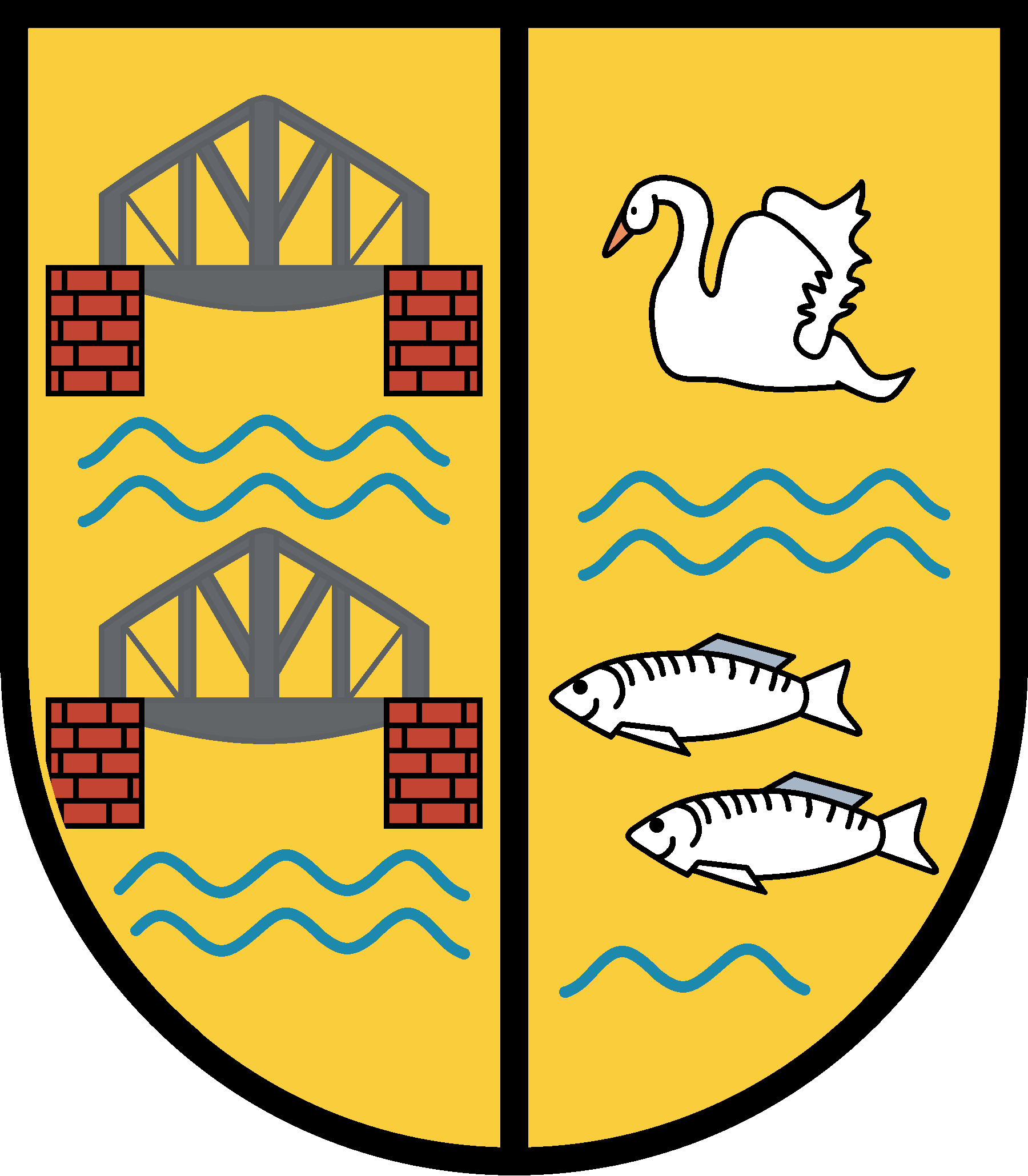
- Coat of arms
- Interactive map of Fresenbrügge
- Location within Germany Location within Mecklenburg-Vorpommern
- Coordinates: 53°15′53″N 11°32′26″E
- Country: Germany
- State: Mecklenburg-Vorpommern
- District: Ludwigslust-Parchim
- Town: Grabow

Area
  - Total: 4.89 km^{2} (1.89 sq mi)
- Elevation: 30 m (98 ft)

Population (2022)
  - Total: 58
  - Density: 12/km^{2} (31/sq mi)
- Time zone: UTC+01:00 (CET)
  - Summer (DST): UTC+02:00 (CEST)
- Postal codes: 19300
- Dialling codes: 038792
- Vehicle registration: LWL, LUP
- Website: www.amt-grabow.de

Fresenbrügge is a village and ortsteil in the municipality of Grabow within the Ludwigslust-Parchim district of Mecklenburg-Vorpommern, Germany. It is primarily known for its camping site on the Elde river.

== Geography ==
The former municipal territory of Fresenbrügge is preserved in the Gemarkung Fresenbrügge which also includes the settlement of Neu Fresenbrügge to the village's west and has an area of 4.89 square kilometres (1.89 sq mi). Its southern and eastern border is formed by the Elde river while the northern border is formed by a forest path that continues the Fresebrügger Dorfstraße, the village's primary road. The territory is bisected by the A14 highway. Forest coverage exists both to the (north-)west and the (south-)east of the village.

The village is rarely referred to as Alt Fresenbrügge to differentiate it from Neu Fresenbrügge which lies 1.75 kilometres (1.09 mi) to its west and is part of the same historical territory (Gemarkung).

The village lies around 1.5 kilometres (0.93 mi) south-west of Grabow, the nearest town and municipal centre. Its closest settlements are the villages Neu Fresenbrügge to the west and Wanzlitz to the south-west, both roughly 2 kilometres (1.2 mi) away respectively.

== History ==
Fresenbrügge was first mentioned as Frysenbrugge on 1 May 1285 when it was gifted to the Saint Georgs church in Grabow by the count Volrad III or IV of Dannenberg, this account has however been questioned as potentially inauthentic. By the 13th century, Fresenbrügge was known to be financially part of (Kämmerei) Grabow.

It is believed that the Wends continued to densely populate the site of the village until way after German colonization. In 1602, there were nine residents in Fresenbrügge who appeared in the Türkensteuerliste of Grabow, three of whom had Slavic last names despite names of Slavic origin not being recorded in the settlement previously.

By 1845, Fresenbrügge had a forestry and a brickworks.

In summer 1867, during the construction of the Elde canal at Fresenbrügge, a beaver's bones and nest were found, they were then brought to Parchim for examination.

In 1896, Fresenbrügge, still part of the Kämmerei in Grabow, was home to one Erbpächter, six Büdner (including both the lock keeper and the Schenkwirt, as well as five Häusler. Its Ausbau Neu Fresenbrügge was home to six Erbpächter, a school, and another lock keeper.

Fresenbrügge was a separate municipality until 1950 when it was, together with Wanzlitz, annexed into the town of Grabow. It has since been an ortsteil of the town.

In 2022, a man in Fresenbrügge was investigated by police for causing a wildfire effecting 4,000 square metres (43,000 sq ft) of grassland while trying to flame out his own property and burning trash. The man allegedly also insulted the firefighters and tried to prevent them from extinguishing the flames.

== Demographics ==
Historical population

Year	Pop.	±%
1843	183	—
1845	153	−16.4%
1851	170	+11.1%
1852	167	−1.8%
1853	167	+0.0%
1885	67	−59.9%
1895	55	−17.9%

Year	Pop.	±%
1901	69	+25.5%
1910	126	+82.6%
1933	128	+1.6%
1939	107	−16.4%
1946	177	+65.4%
2010	56	−68.4%
2022	58	+3.6%

Data may be affected by territorial fluctuation.
Sources: 1843, 1845,1851–1853, 1885, 1895 1901, 1910, 1933 & 1939, 1946, 2022

== Economy ==
Fresenbrügge is home to a camping site that acts both as a Wasserwanderrastplatz and a motorhome pitch. Since 1 January 2026, it is administered by Lena Friedrich. The village is also home to the Mrowiec – Fenster, Türen und Wintergärten GmbH carpentry, founded in 1986, that, since 2018, owns around 36,000 square metres (390,000 sq ft) of the village territory.

== Gallery ==
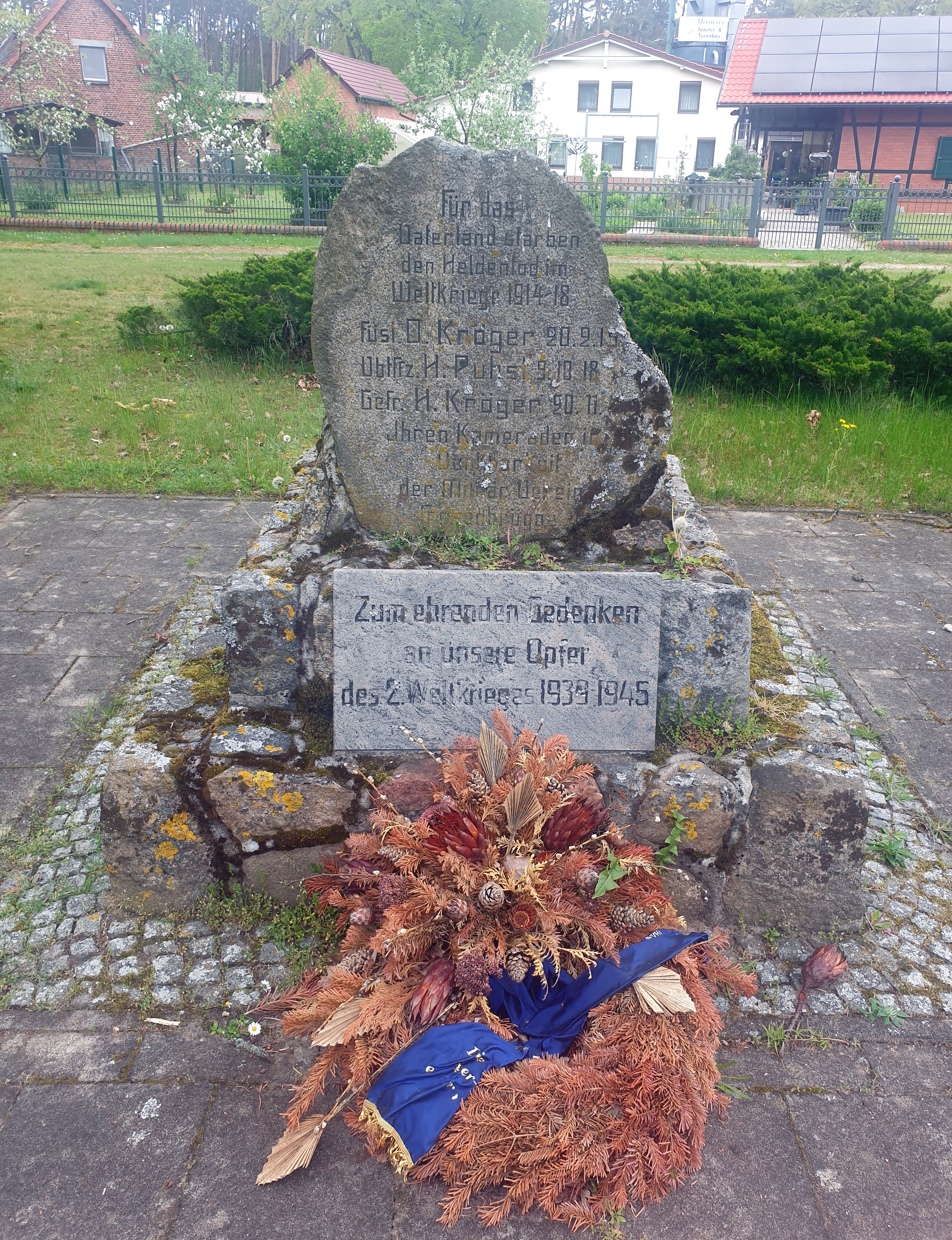
Memorial for World War I and II

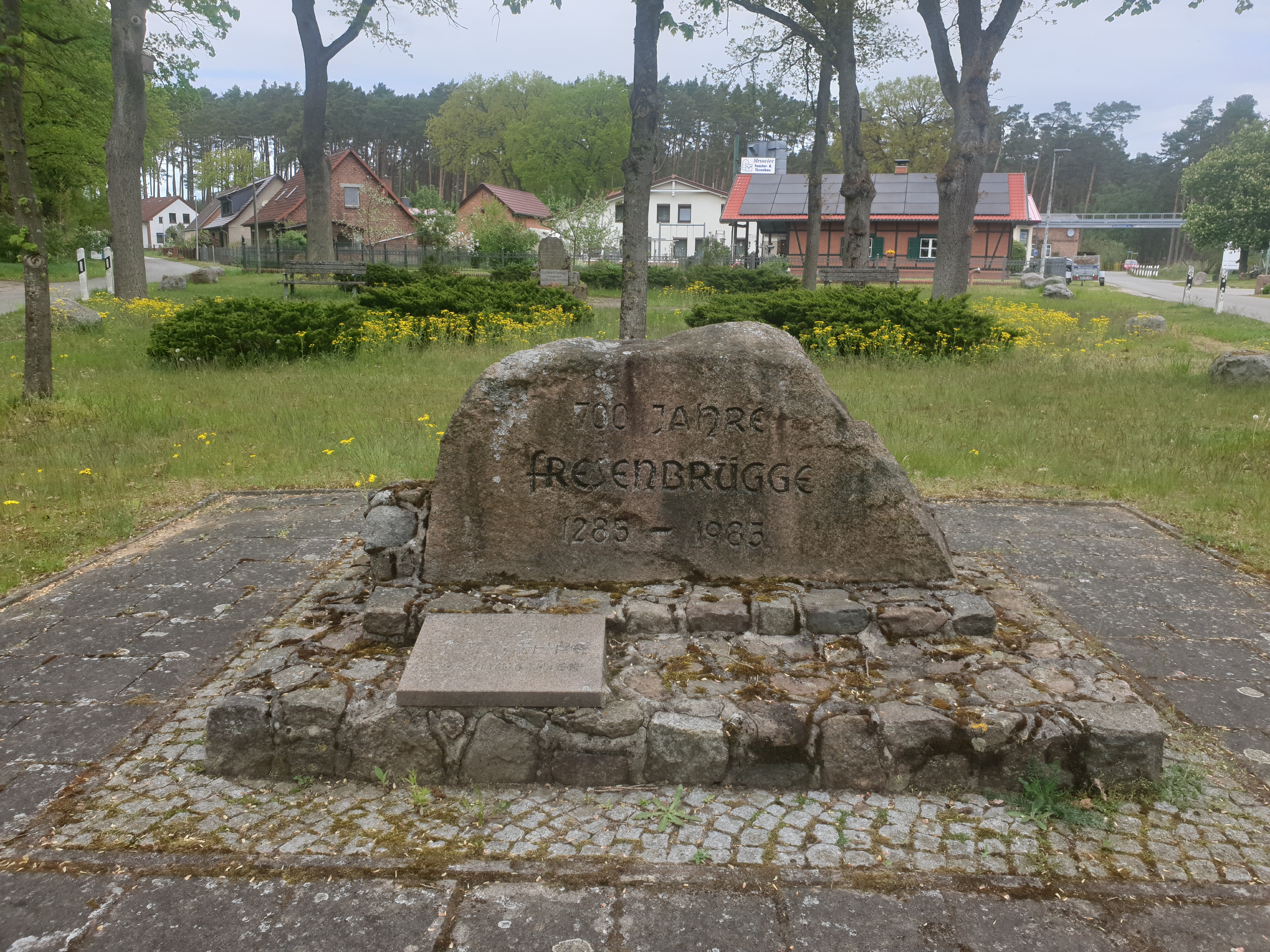
Monument celebrating 700 years Fresebrügge

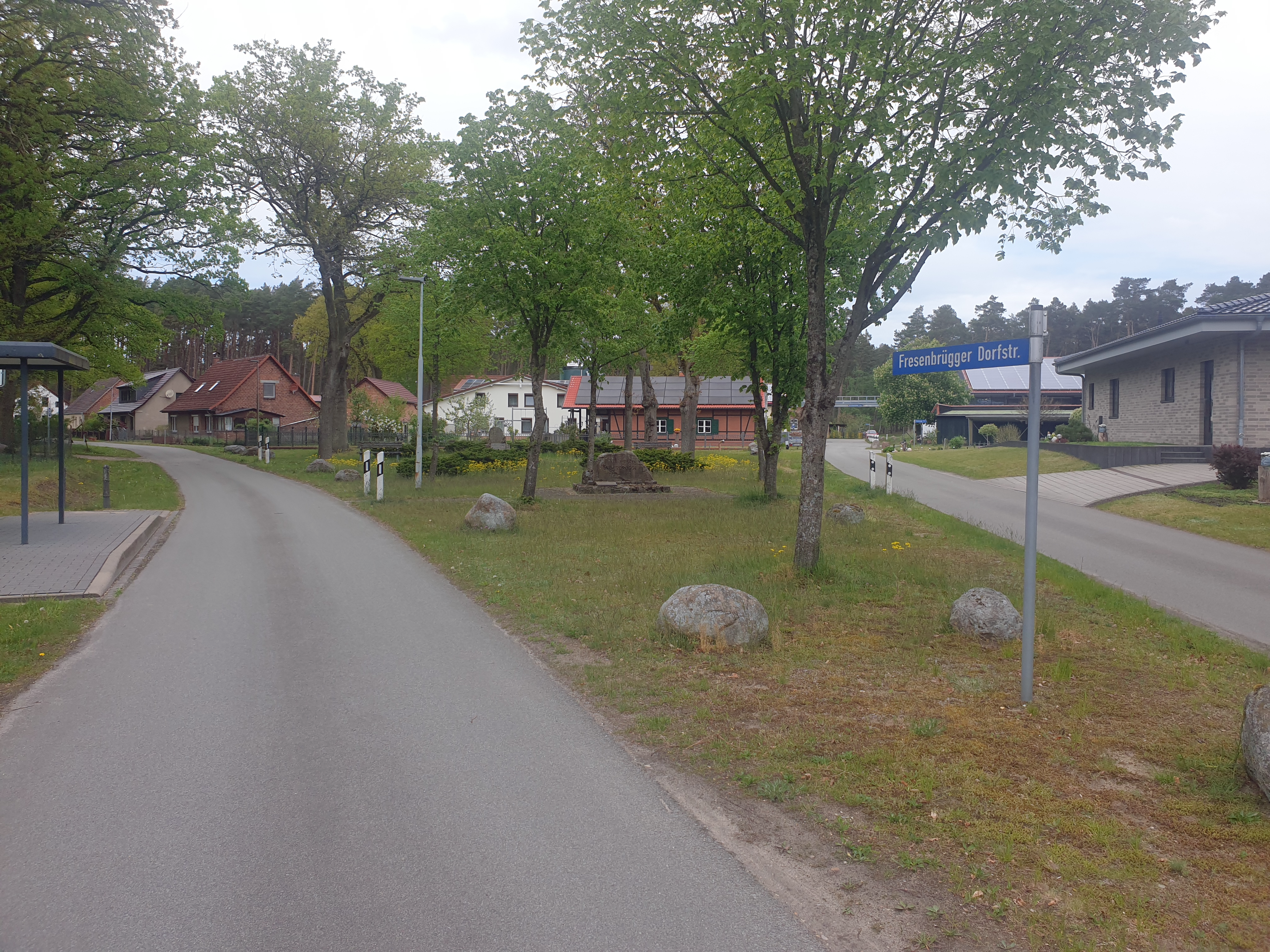
Small park containing both monuments

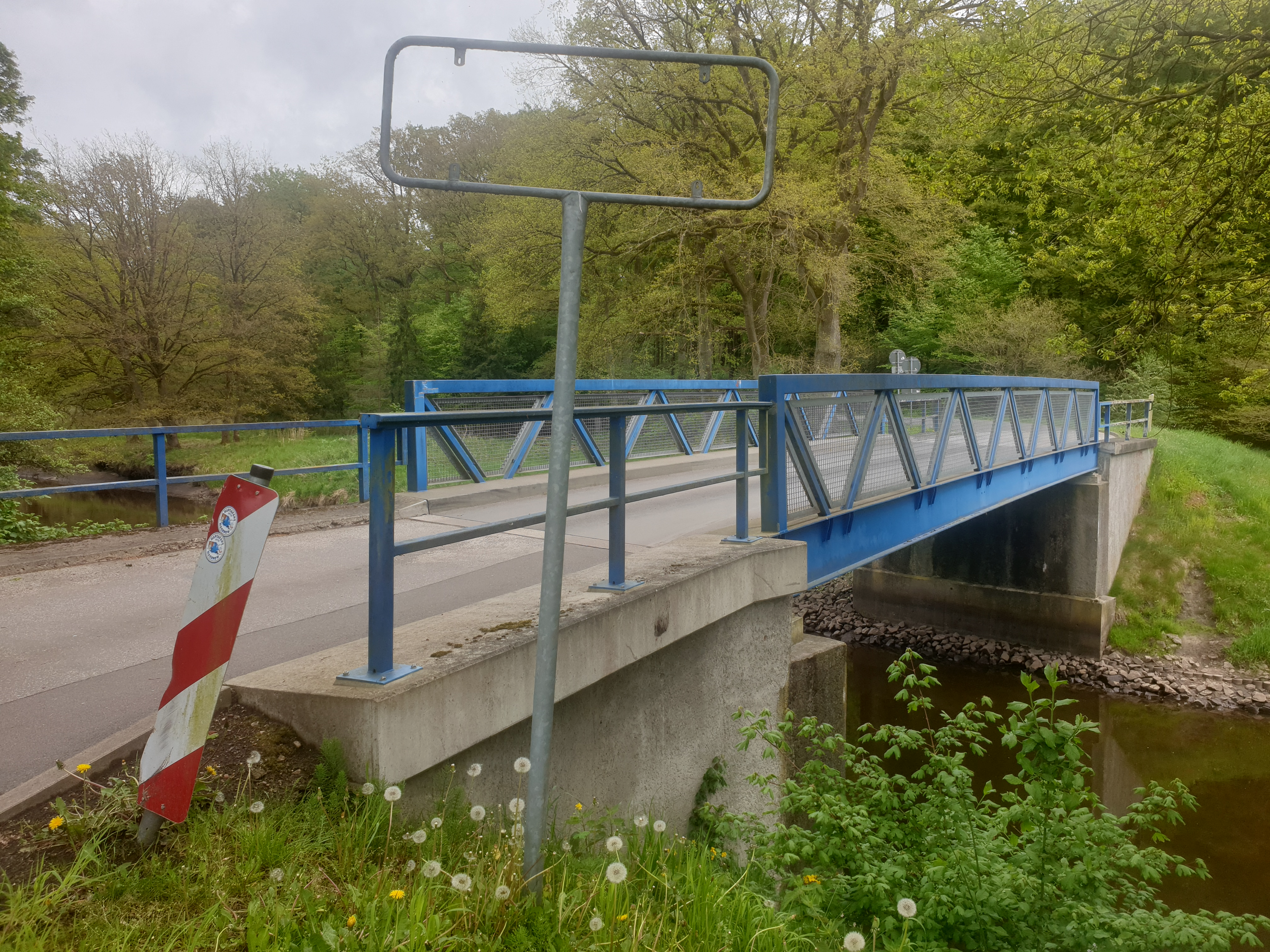
Bridge 1 over the Old Elde (viewed from north)

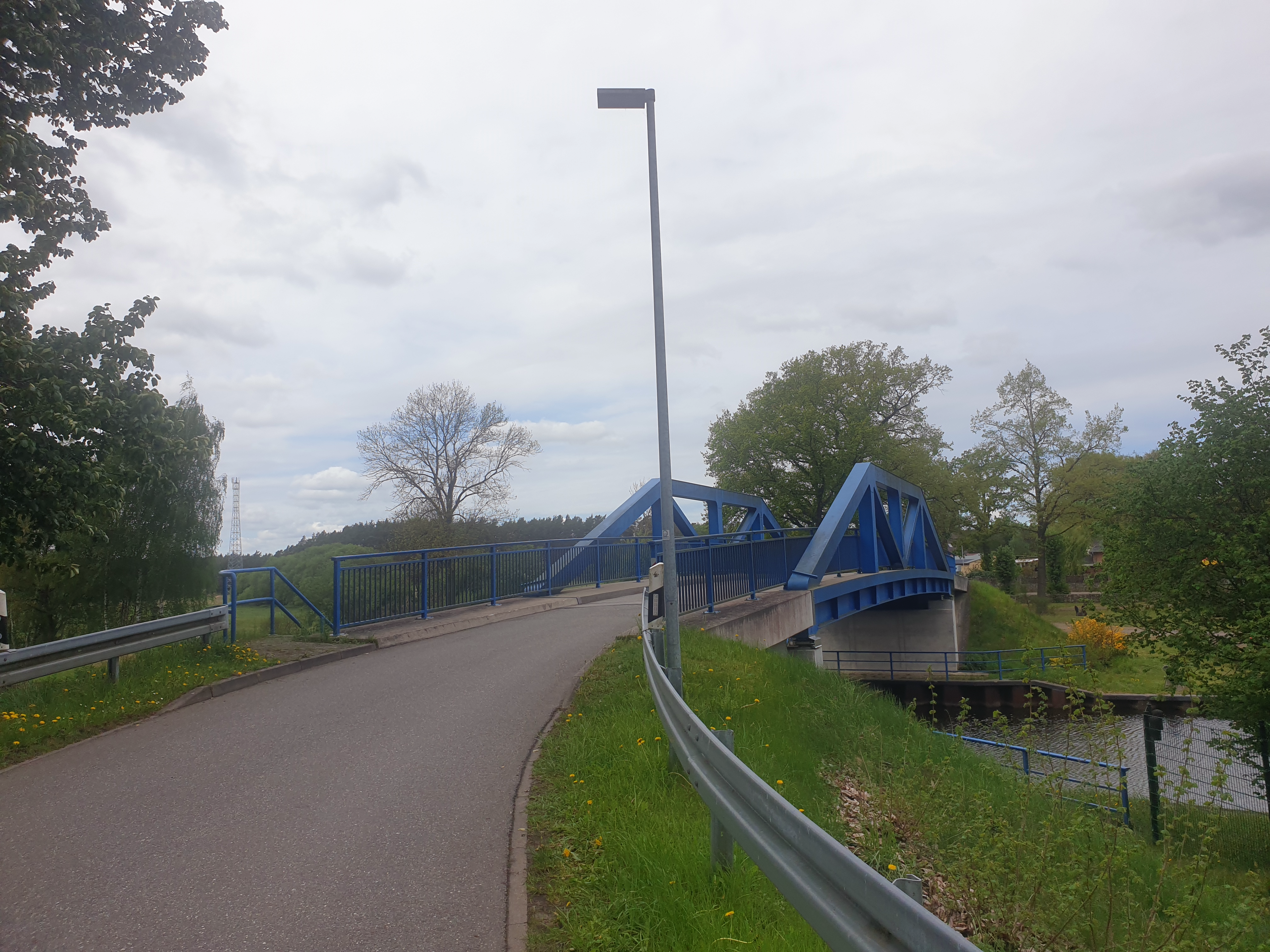
Bridge 2 over the New Elde (viewed from south)

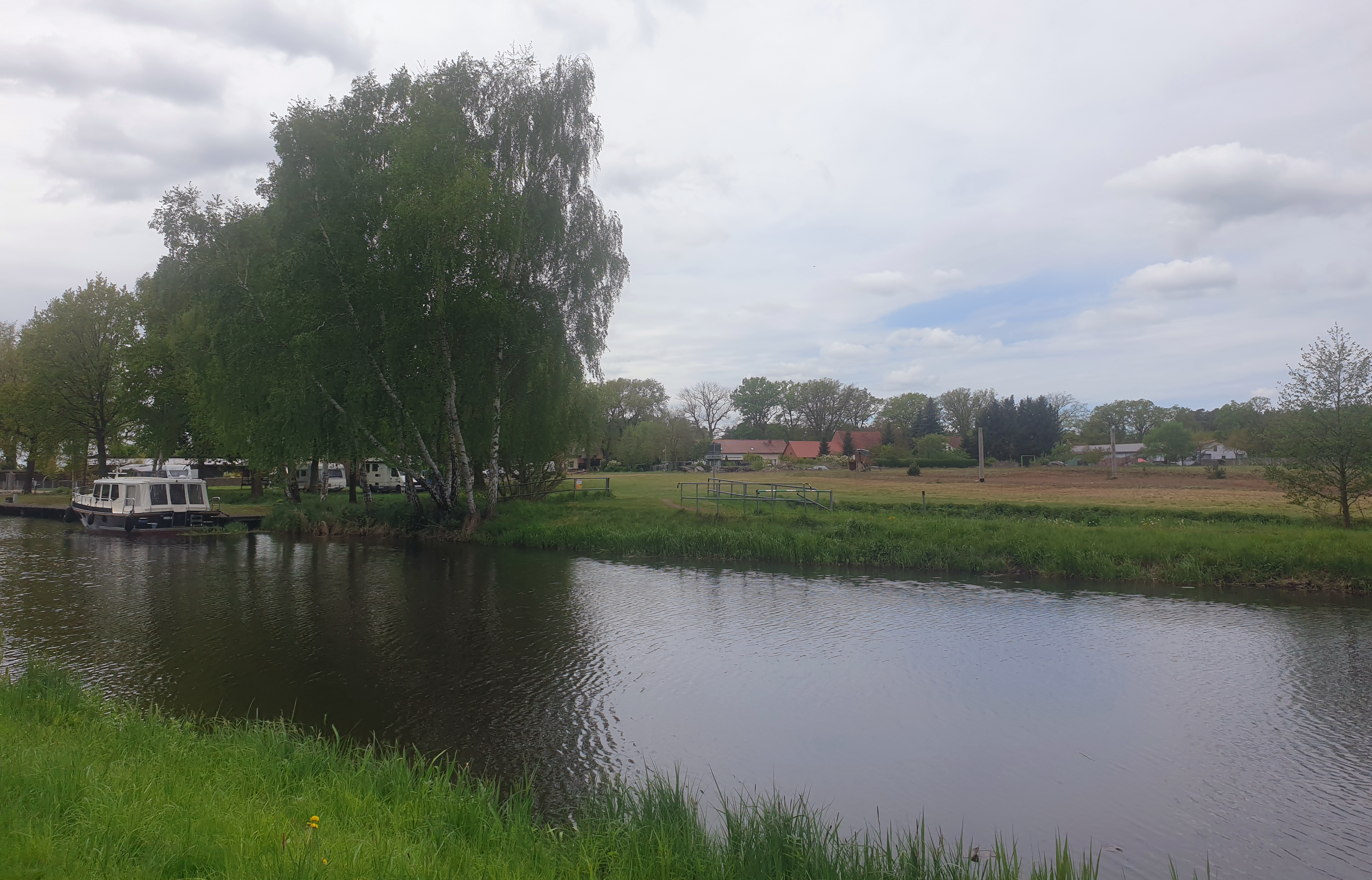
Fresebrügge as viewed from the right Elde-shore

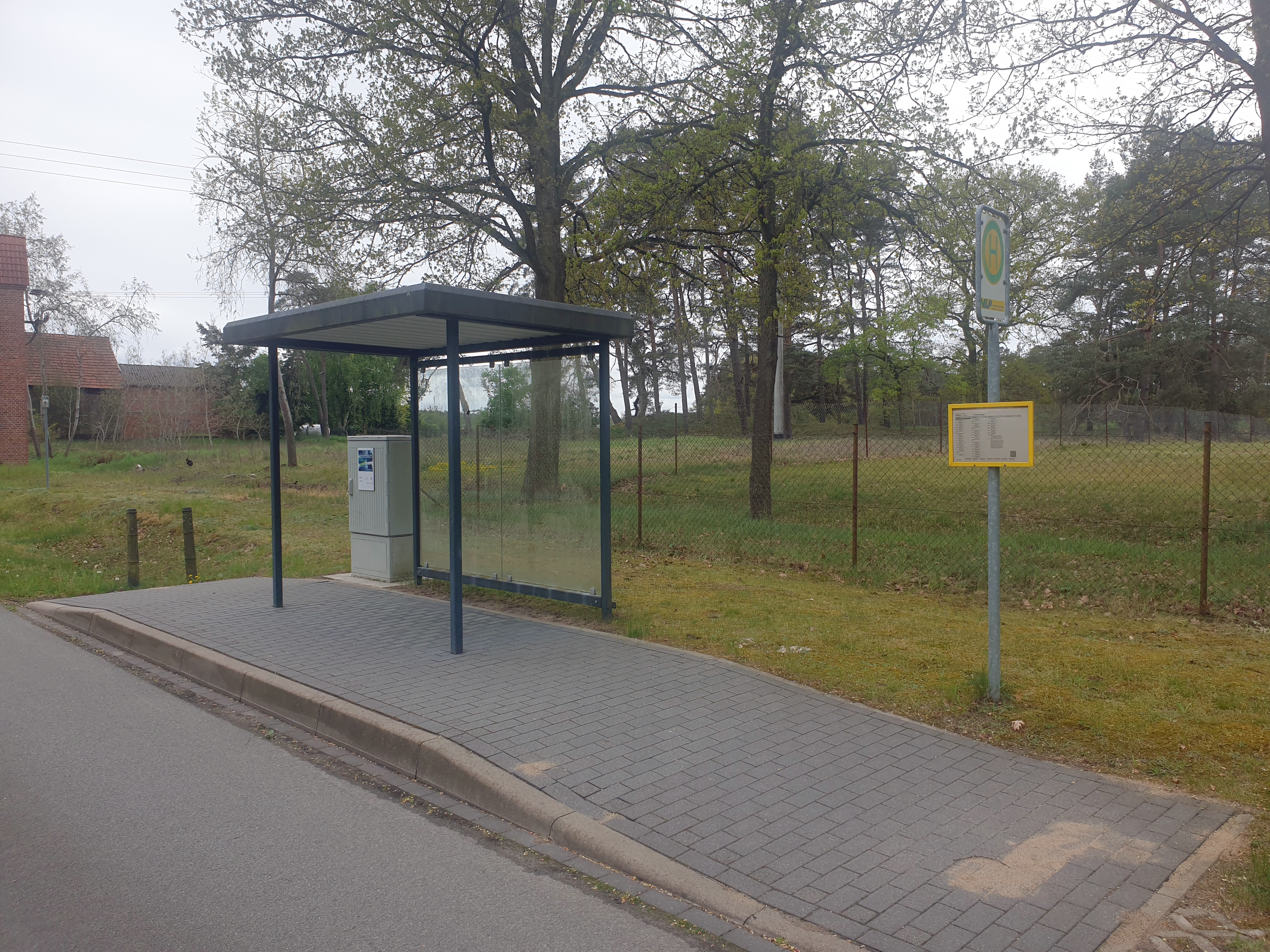
Village bus stop

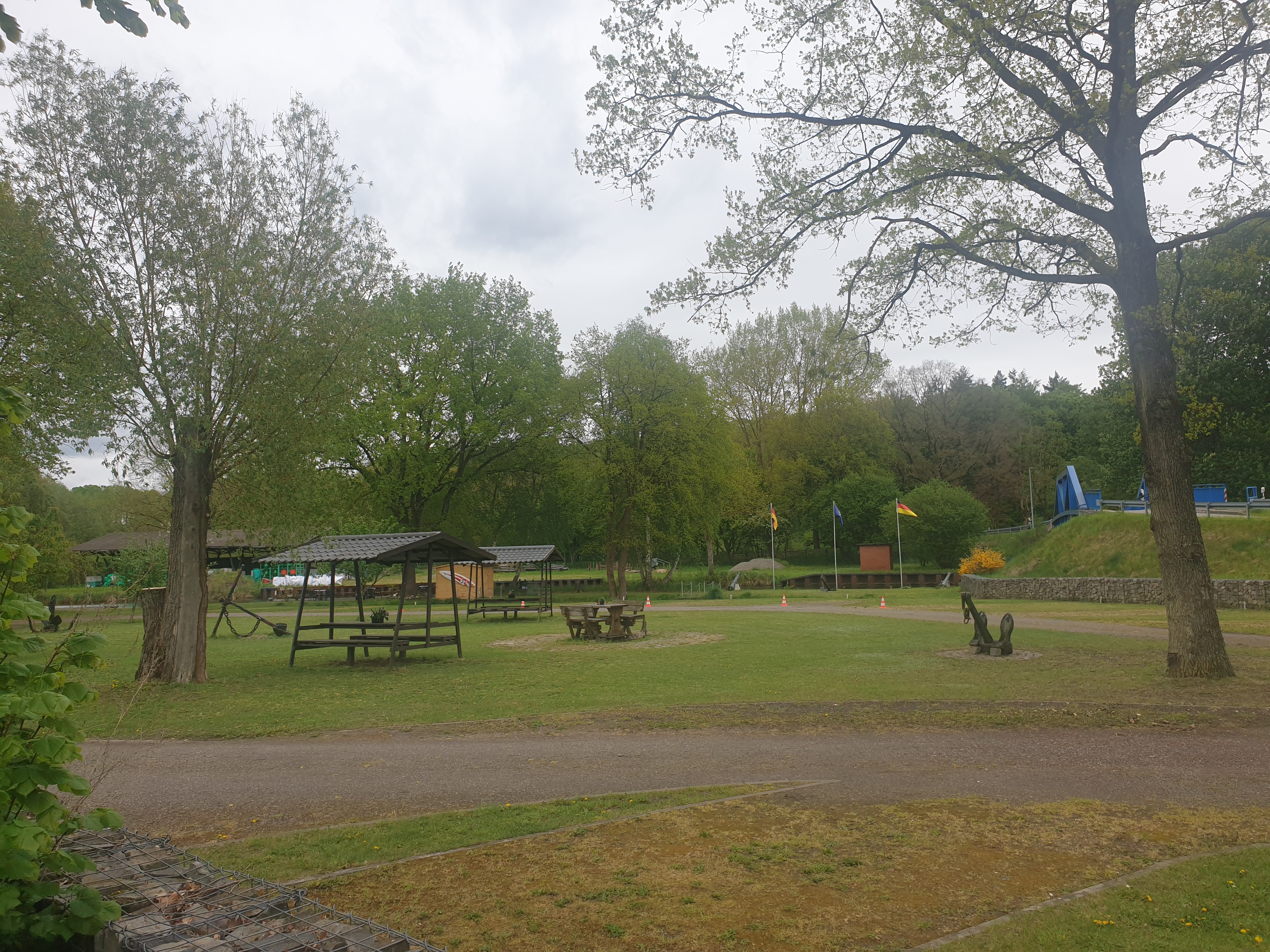
Camping site
