= Temse (Warnow) =

River in Germany

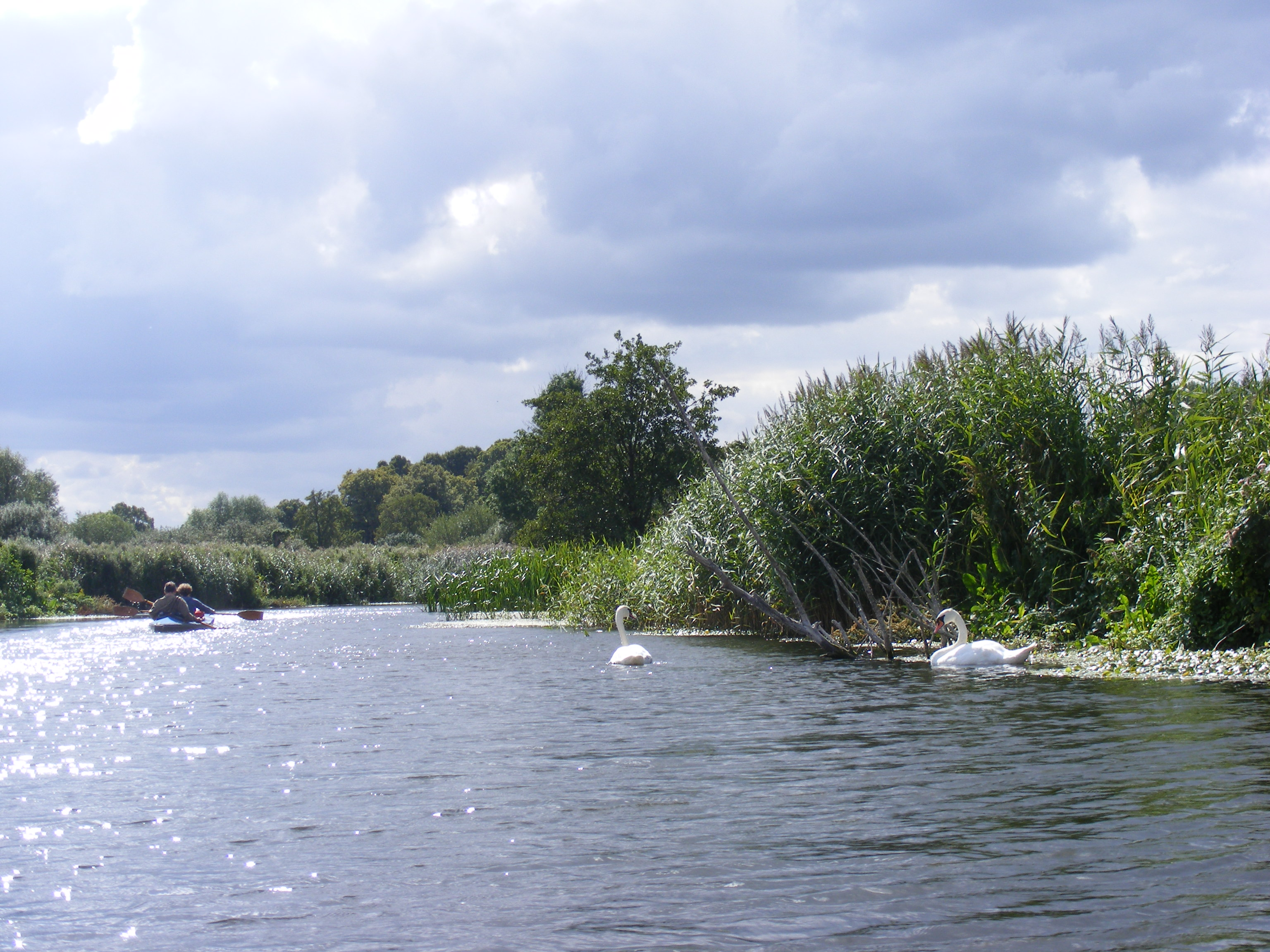

Location
- Country: Germany
- State: Mecklenburg-Vorpommern

Physical characteristics
- Source
  - location: Bützower See
- Mouth
  - location: Warnow
  - coordinates: 53.8583°N 12.0004°E

Basin features
- Progression: Warnow→ Baltic Sea

Temse is a short river of Mecklenburg-Vorpommern, Germany. It is a left tributary of the Warnow. It is the outflow of the Bützower See.

== See also ==
- List of rivers of Mecklenburg-Vorpommern
