= Schwinge =

Schwinge may refer to:

- Schwinge (Elbe), a river of Lower Saxony, Germany, tributary of the Elbe
- Schwinge (Peene), a river of Mecklenburg-Vorpommern, Germany, tributary of the Peene
