= Schmaar =

River in Mecklenburg-Vorpommern, Germany

Location
- Country: Germany
- State: Mecklenburg-Vorpommern

Physical characteristics
- Mouth
  - location: Sude
  - coordinates: 53.3388°N 11.1678°E

Basin features
- Progression: Sude→ Elbe→ North Sea

The Schmaar (German pronunciation: [ʃmaːɐ̯]) is a river of Mecklenburg-Vorpommern, Germany. Its source lies between Wittenburg and Hagenow. It flows through Hagenow, and flows into the Sude near Redefin. Part of its course is called Kleine Sude.

== See also ==
- List of rivers of Mecklenburg-Vorpommern
