= Goldbach (Tollense) =

River in Germany

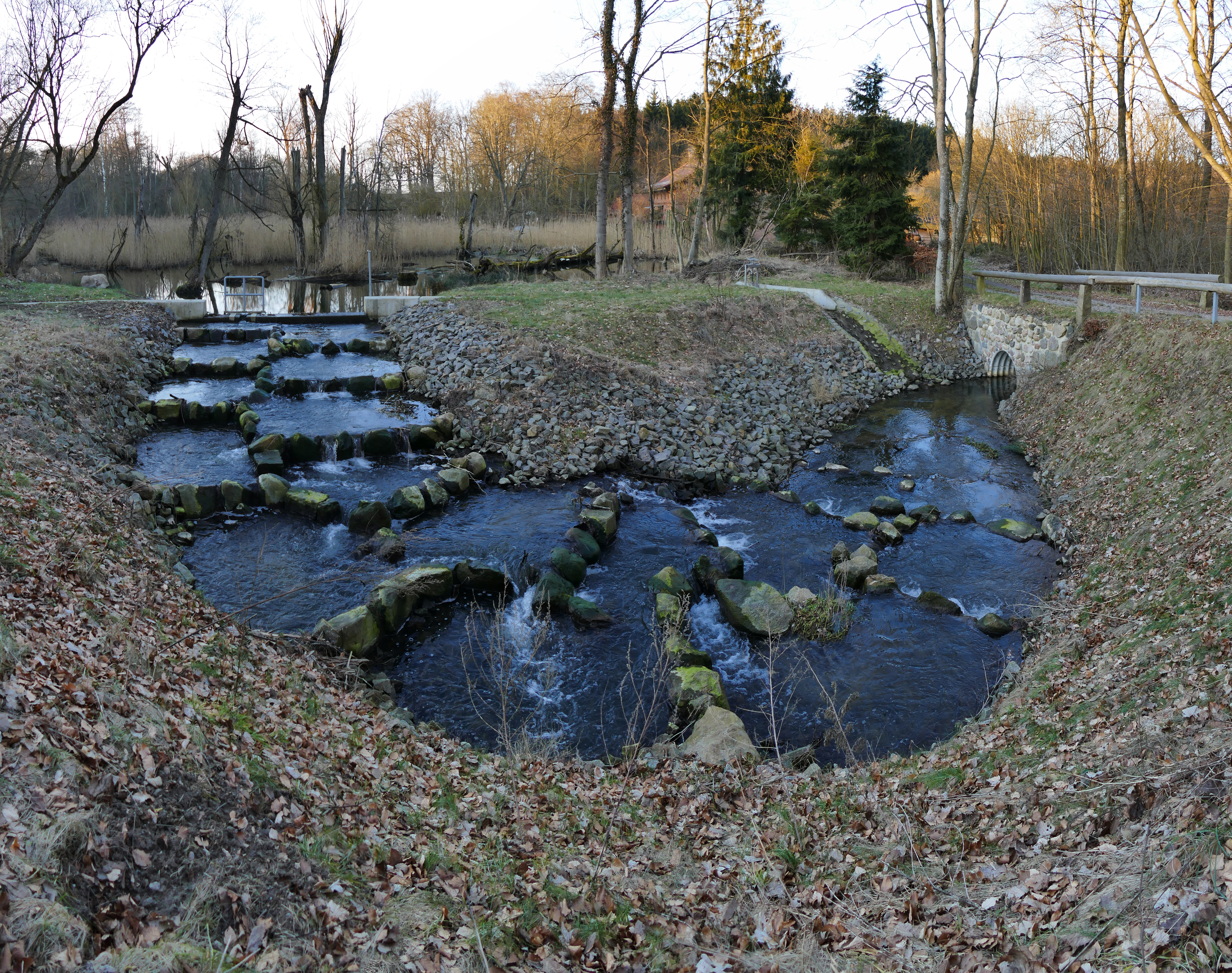

Location
- Country: Germany
- States: Mecklenburg-Vorpommern

Physical characteristics
- Mouth
  - location: Tollense
  - coordinates: 53.7294°N 13.2857°E

Basin features
- Progression: Tollense→ Peene→ Baltic Sea

Goldbach (German pronunciation: [ˈɡɔltbax]) is a river of Mecklenburg-Vorpommern, Germany. It is a tributary of the Tollense.

== See also ==
- List of rivers of Mecklenburg-Vorpommern
