= Steinbach (Sassnitz) =

River in Germany

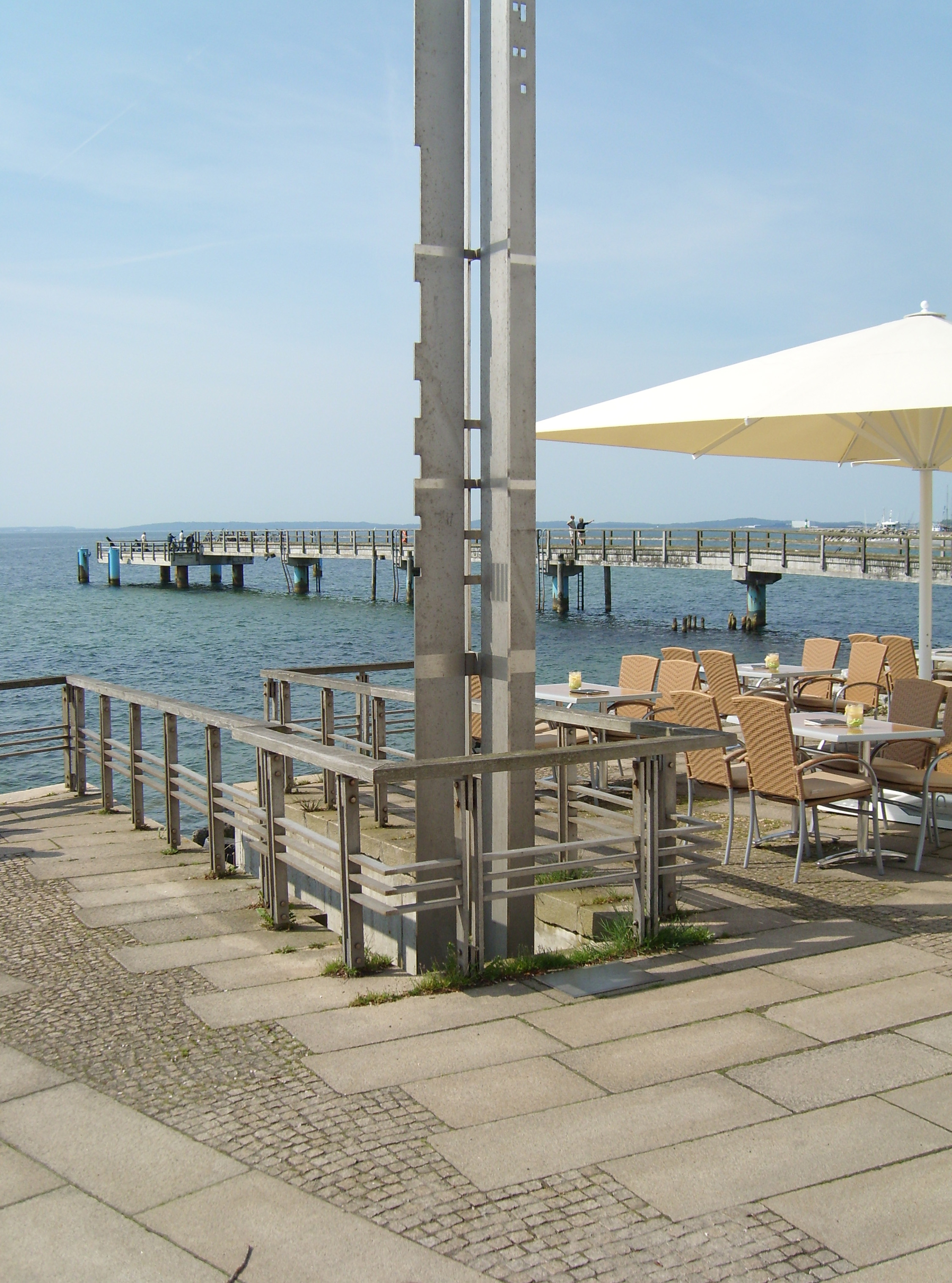

Location
- Country: Germany
- State: Mecklenburg-Vorpommern

Physical characteristics
- Mouth
  - location: Baltic Sea
  - coordinates: 54.5167°N 13.6565°E

Steinbach is a small stream on the island of Rügen, Mecklenburg-Vorpommern, Germany. Its source is in the Jasmund National Park, and it flows into the Baltic Sea in the town of Sassnitz.

== See also ==
- List of rivers of Mecklenburg-Vorpommern
