= Bützower See =

Lake in Germany

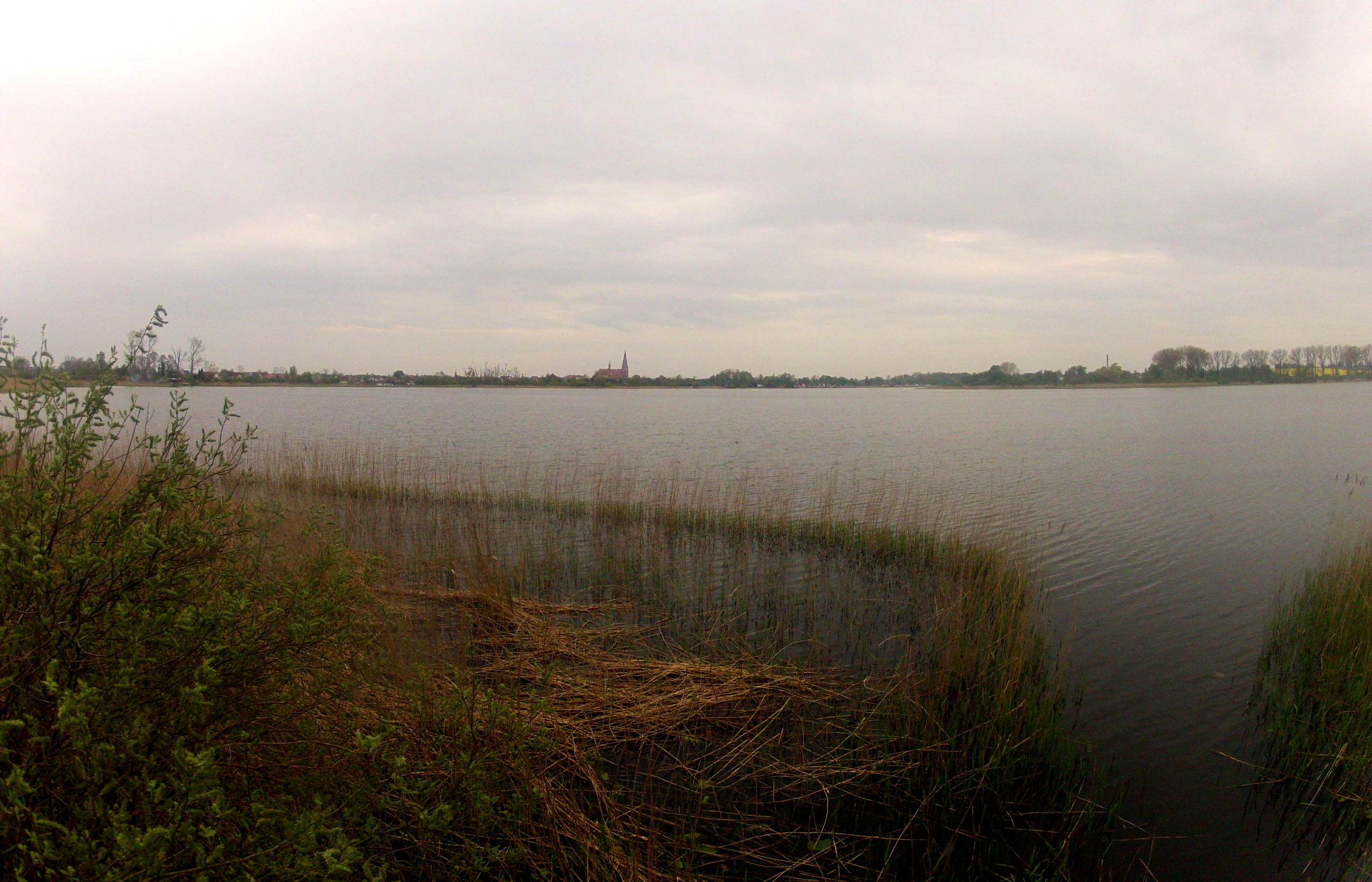

- Location within Mecklenburg-Vorpommern
- Location: Mecklenburg-Vorpommern
- Coordinates: 53°51′28″N 11°59′13″E
- Primary outflows: Temse
- Basin countries: Germany
- Surface area: 0.98 km^{2} (0.38 sq mi)
- Average depth: 1.1 m (3 ft 7 in)
- Max. depth: 2.2 m (7 ft 3 in)
- Surface elevation: 0.3 m (1 ft 0 in)
- Settlements: Bützow

Bützower See is a lake in Mecklenburg-Vorpommern, Germany. At an elevation of 0.3 m, its surface area is 0.98 km^{2}.
