= Harkenbäk =

River in Germany

Coordinates: 53°58′N 10°57′E

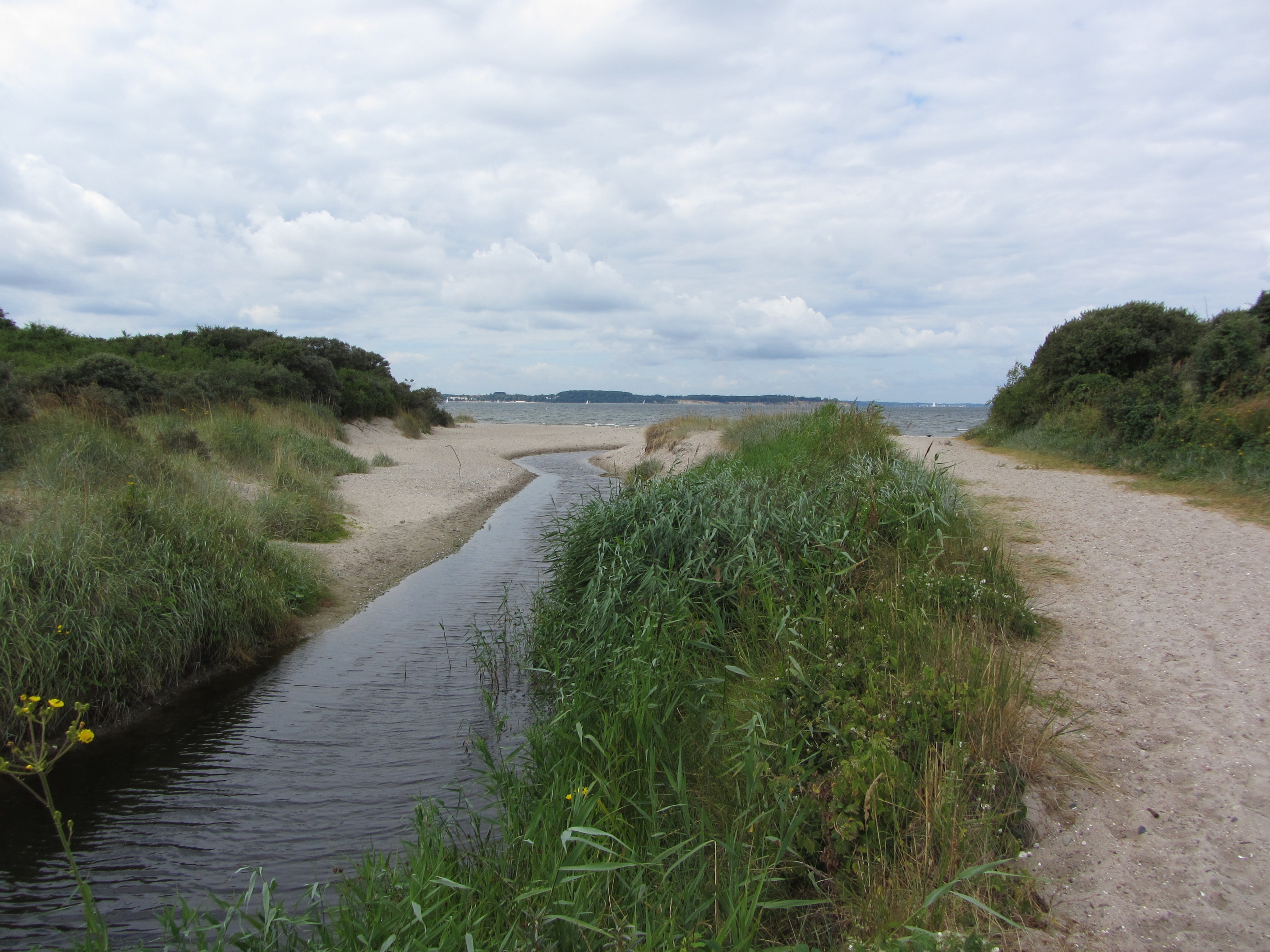
- Mouth of the Harkenbäk in the Baltic

Location
- Country: Germany
- States: Mecklenburg-Vorpommern

Physical characteristics
- Source
  - elevation: 51 metres (167 ft)
- Mouth
  - elevation: 0 m (0 ft)
- Length: 5.9 km (3.7 mi)

Harkenbäk (or Harkenbeck, Harkenbeek) is a creek in Mecklenburg-Vorpommern, Germany that empties into the Baltic Sea.

The Harkenbäk rises west of the Schippmannsberges between the city of Dassow and the district of Pötenitz in northwest Mecklenburg. It flows northwest to the Bay of Lübeck in the Baltic Sea. In 1188 Frederick I, Holy Roman Emperor, defined the mouth of the creek as the seaward boundary of the harbor of Travemünde.

== See also ==
- List of rivers of Mecklenburg-Vorpommern
