= Schillerbach =

River in Germany

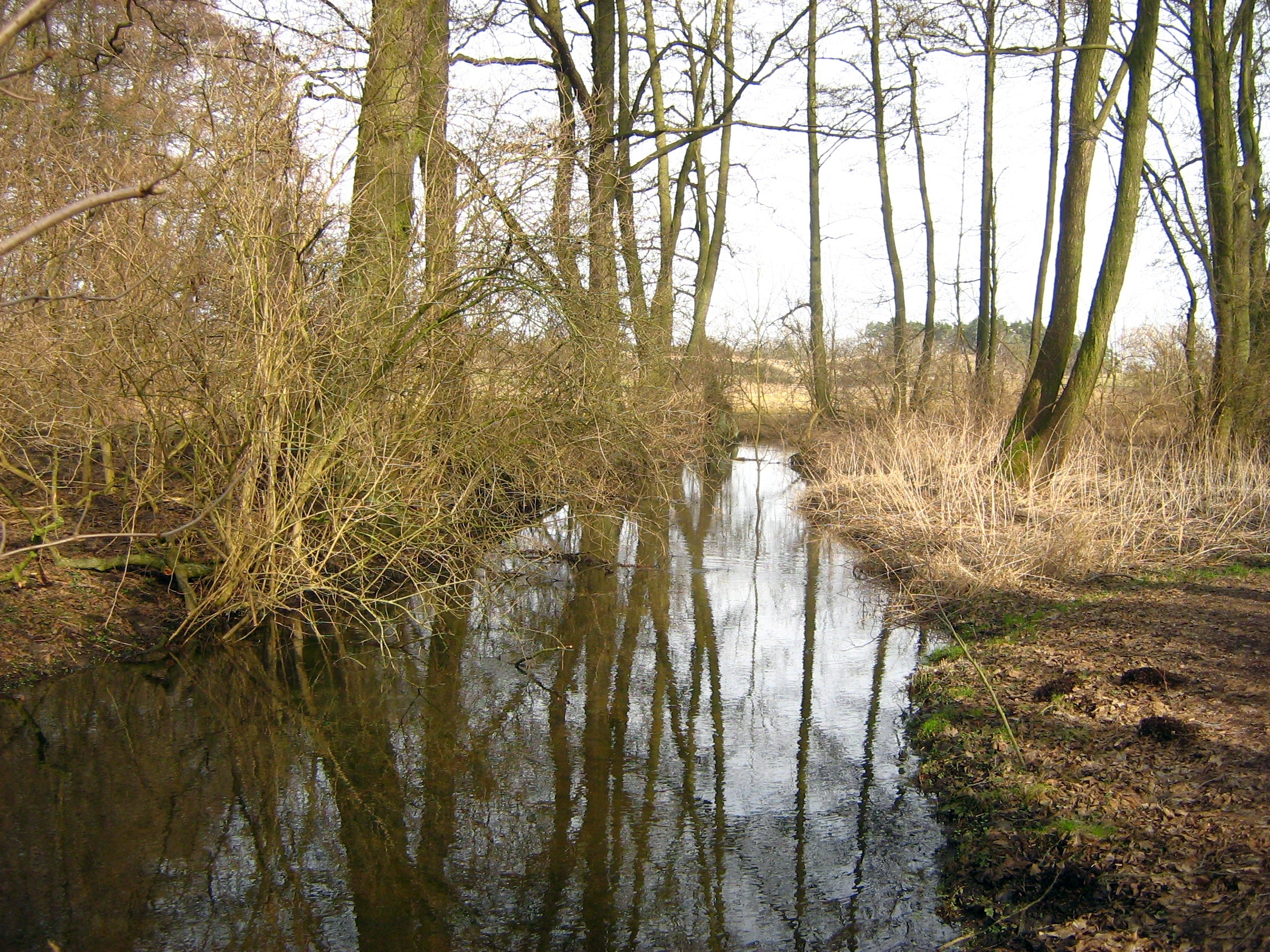

Location
- Country: Germany
- States: Mecklenburg-Vorpommern

Physical characteristics
- Mouth
  - location: Randow
  - coordinates: 53.4452°N 14.2379°E

Basin features
- Progression: Randow→ Uecker→ Baltic Sea

Schillerbach is a river of Mecklenburg-Vorpommern, Germany. It flows into the Löcknitzer See, which is drained by the Randow, near Löcknitz.

== See also ==
- List of rivers of Mecklenburg-Vorpommern
