= Grube (Wismar) =

River in Germany

Coordinates: 53.8954°N 11.4601°E

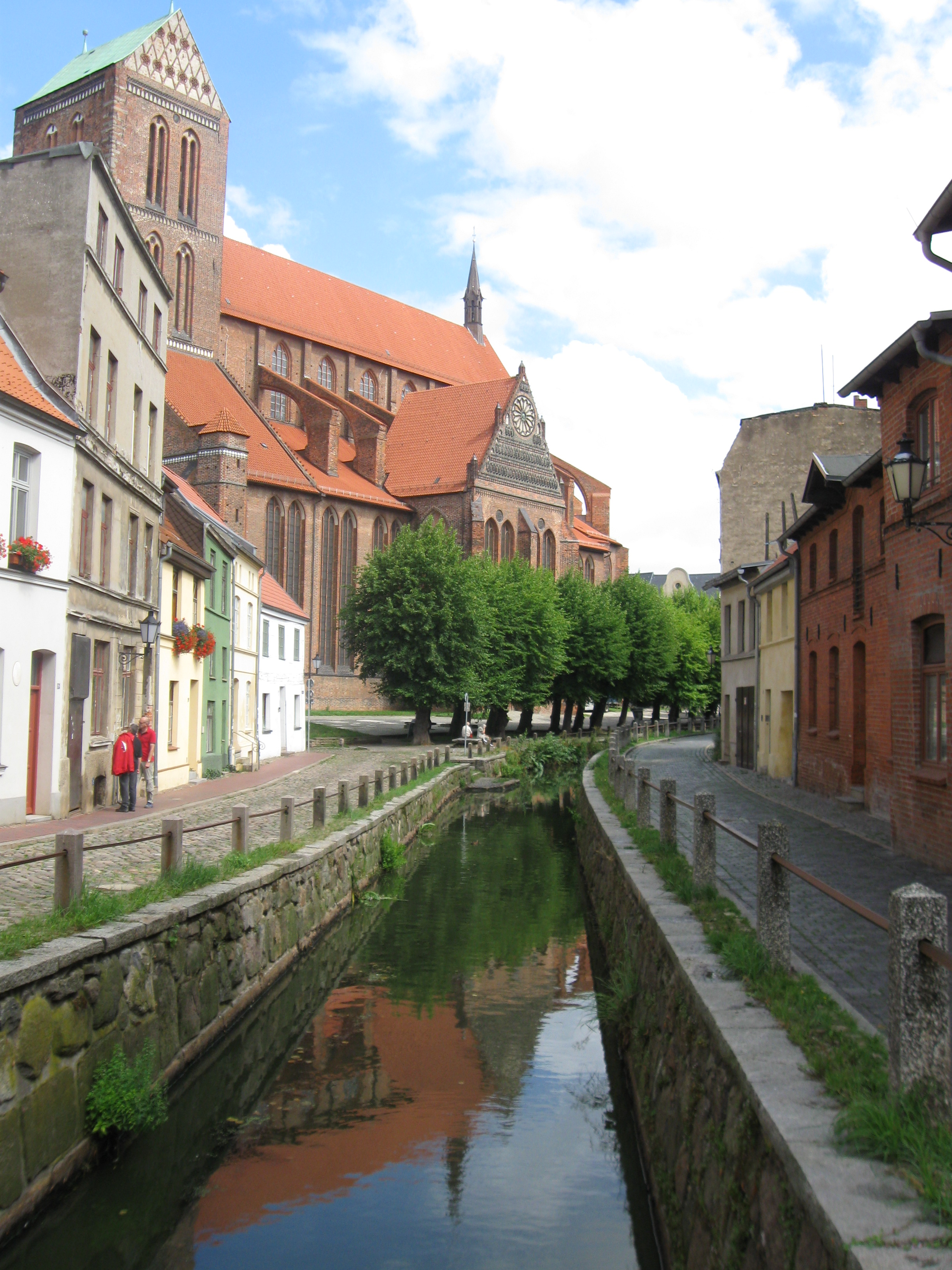
- The Grube and St. Nicholas Church

Location
- Country: Germany
- States: Mecklenburg-Vorpommern

Physical characteristics
- Mouth
  - location: Baltic Sea

Grube is a river in Wismar, Mecklenburg-Vorpommern, Germany. It is a former medieval canal. It discharges into the old port of Wismar, which is connected to the Baltic Sea.

== See also ==
- List of rivers of Mecklenburg-Vorpommern
