= Wocker =

River in Germany

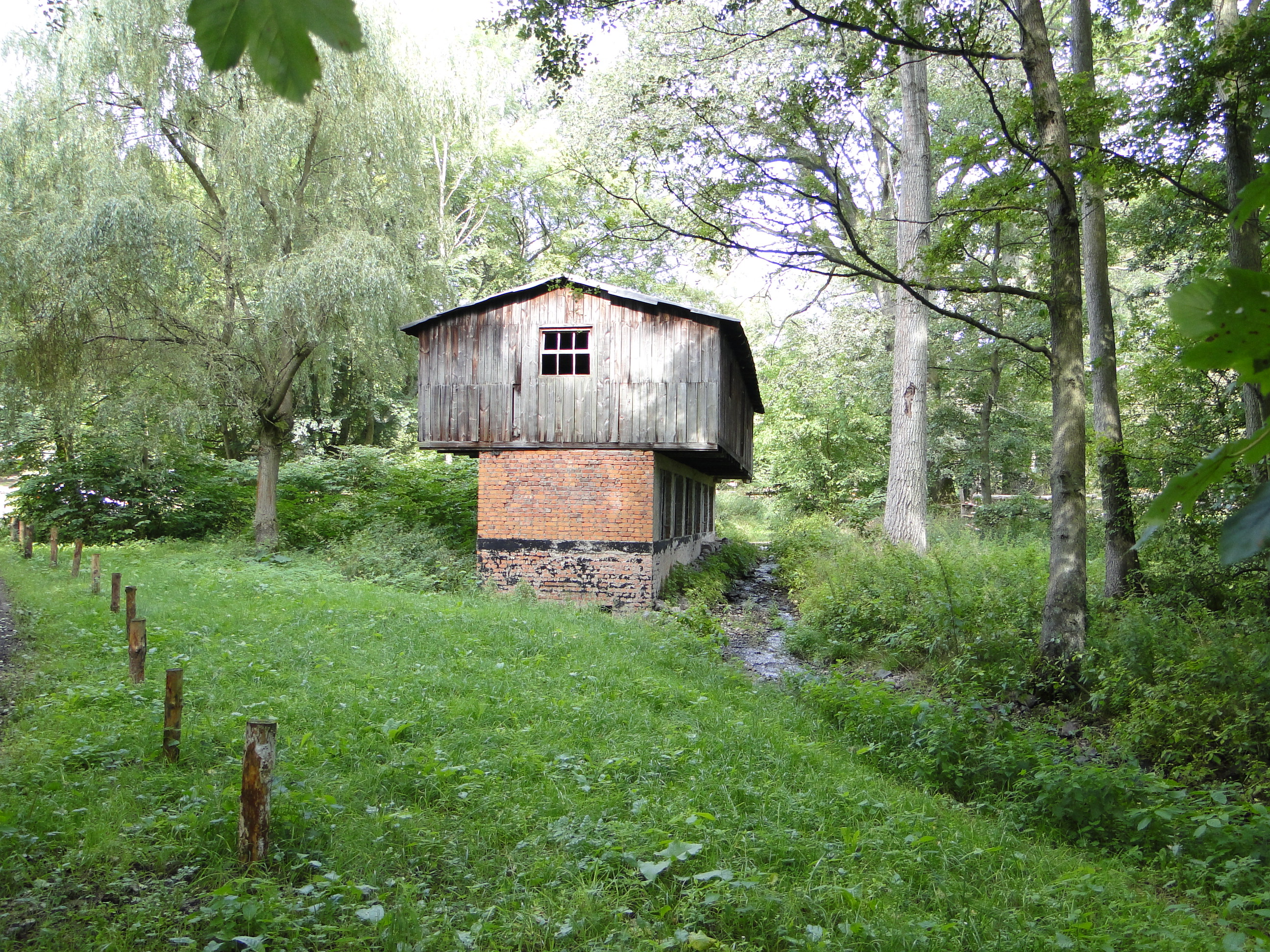

Location
- Country: Germany
- State: Mecklenburg-Vorpommern

Physical characteristics
- Mouth
  - location: Elde
  - coordinates: 53.4287°N 11.8435°E

Basin features
- Progression: Elde→ Elbe→ North Sea

Wocker is a river of Mecklenburg-Vorpommern, Germany. It flows into the Elde in Parchim.

== See also ==
- List of rivers of Mecklenburg-Vorpommern
