= Gadebuscher Bach =

River in Germany

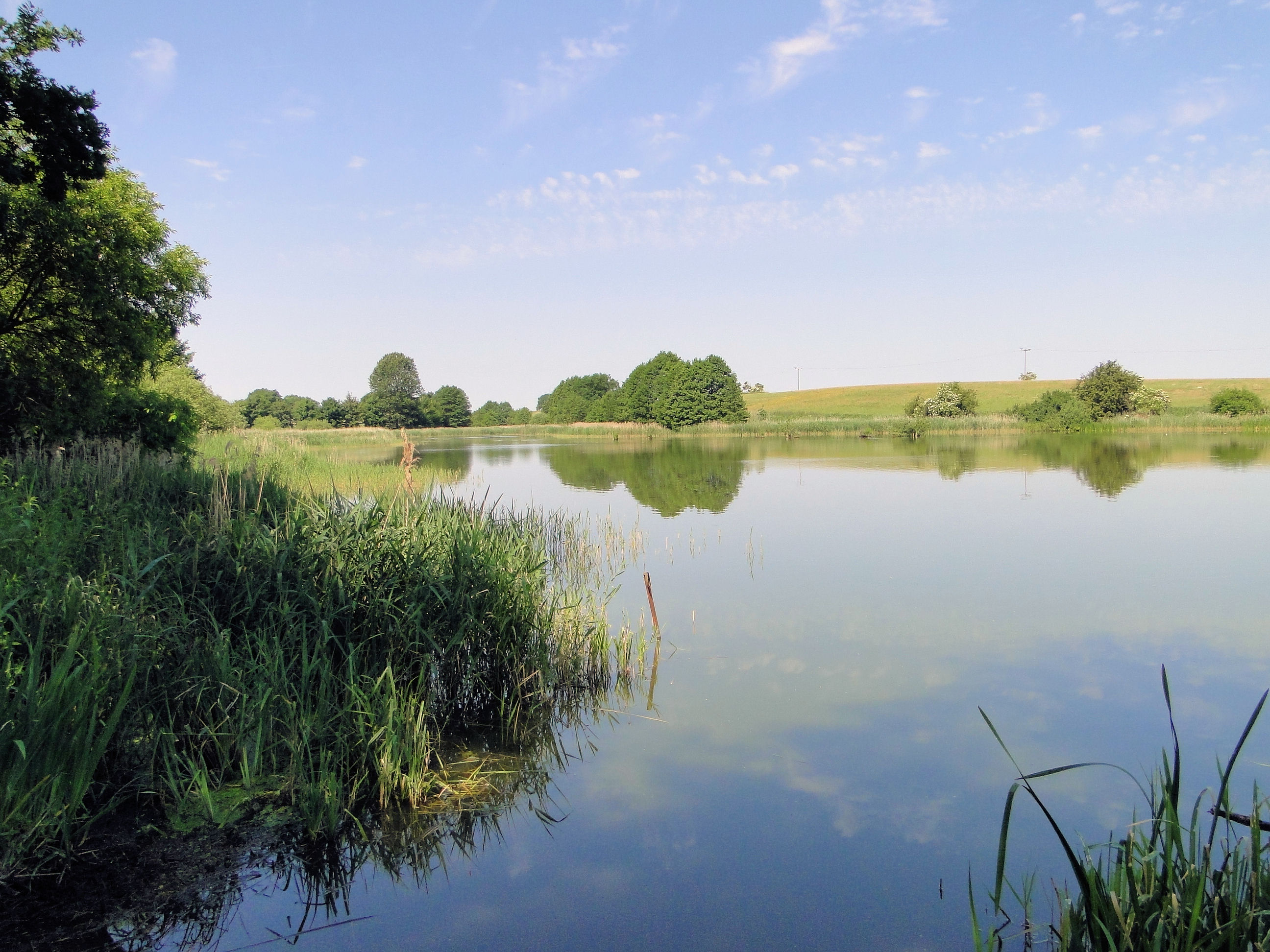

Location
- Country: Germany
- States: Mecklenburg-Vorpommern

Physical characteristics
- Mouth
  - location: Stepenitz
  - coordinates: 53.6818°N 11.2677°E

Basin features
- Progression: Stepenitz→ Trave→ Baltic Sea

Gadebuscher Bach is a river of Mecklenburg-Vorpommern, Germany. Its source is east of the town Gadebusch, and it flows into the Stepenitz near Brüsewitz.

== See also ==
- List of rivers of Mecklenburg-Vorpommern
