= Brebowbach =

River in Germany

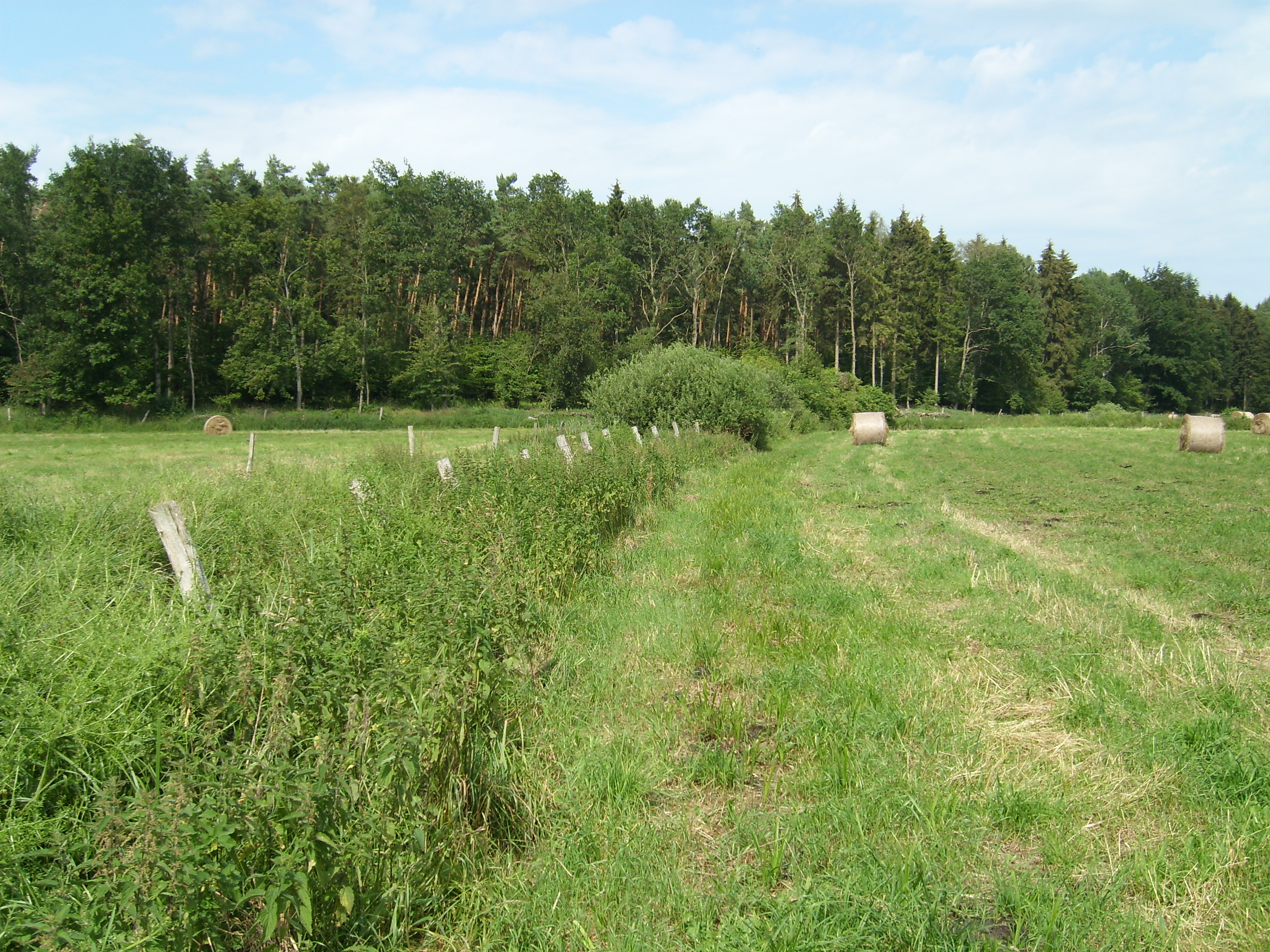

Location
- Country: Germany
- State: Mecklenburg-Vorpommern

Physical characteristics
- Mouth
  - location: Peenestrom
  - coordinates: 53.9885°N 13.8209°E

Brebowbach is a creek in Mecklenburg-Vorpommern, Germany. It flows into the Peenestrom, which is connected with the Baltic Sea, near Zemitz.

== See also ==
- List of rivers of Mecklenburg-Vorpommern
