= Unterwarnow =

River in Germany

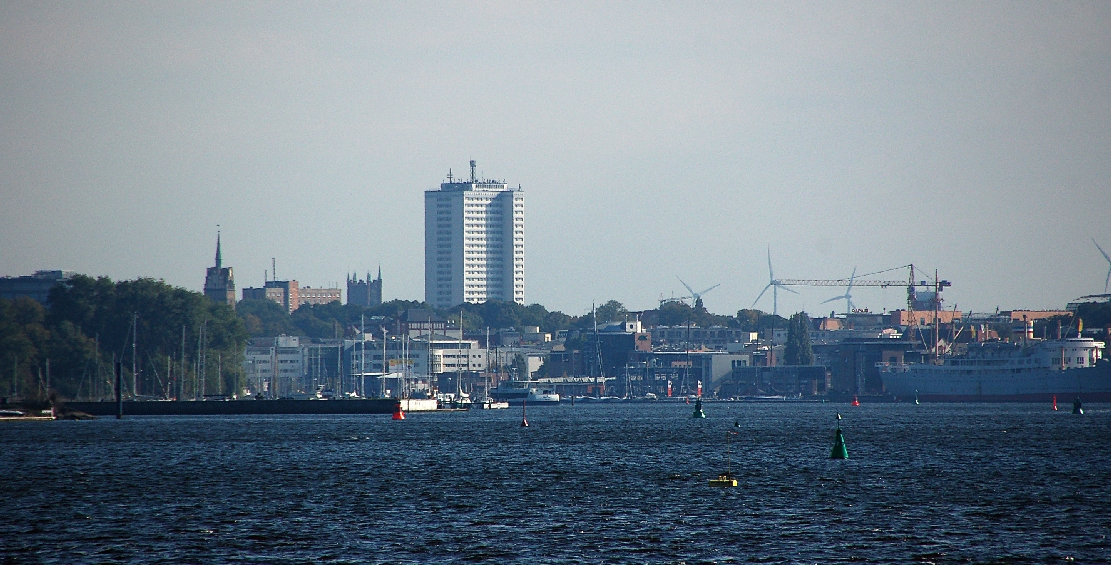
- View to the City of Rostock

- Location within Mecklenburg-Vorpommern
- Location: Baltic Sea
- Coordinates: 54°06′14.7″N 12°06′14.9″E
- River sources: Warnow
- Ocean/sea sources: Atlantic Ocean
- Basin countries: Germany
- Max. depth: 13 m (43 ft)
- Salinity: ~10‰
- Settlements: Rostock

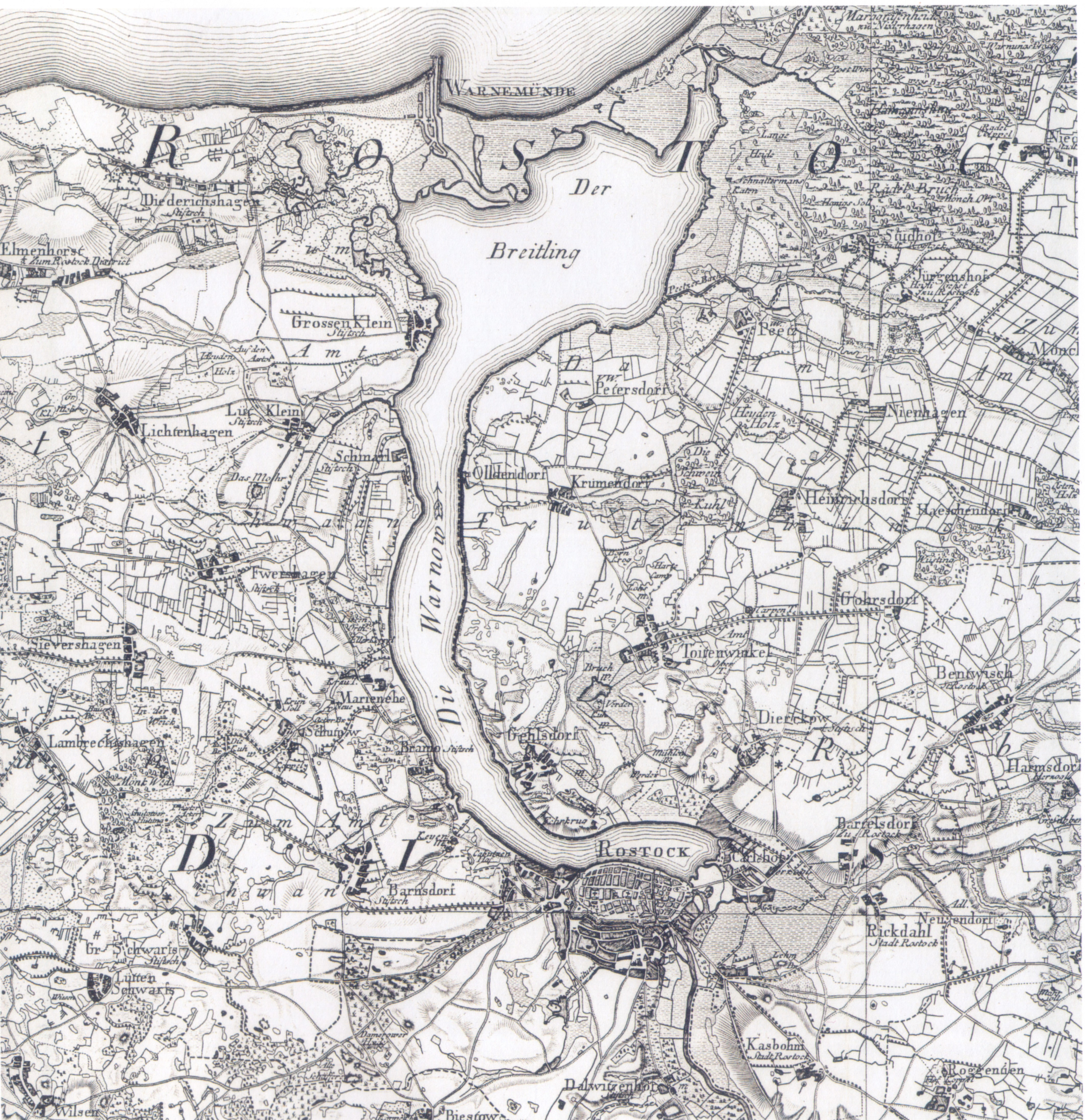
Unterwarnow on the map of 1788

Unterwarnow is the estuary of the Warnow River in Mecklenburg-Vorpommern, northern Germany. It connects with the Baltic Sea in Warnemünde. The city of Rostock is located on its banks.

The part of the riverbed near the river mouth is deepened to allow the passage of larger vessels, it is called "the sea channel" ("Der Seekanal").
