= Zarnow (river) =

River in Germany

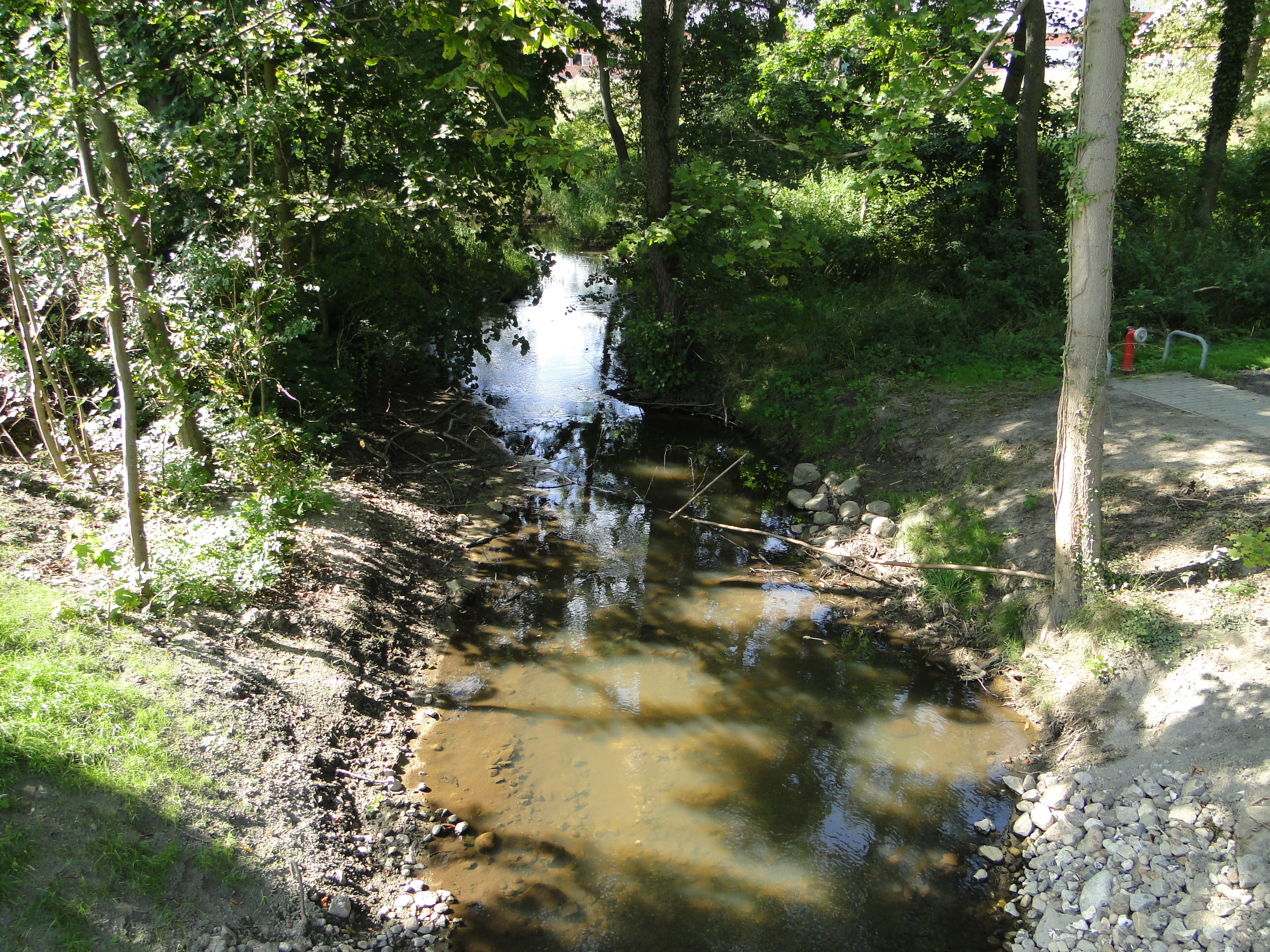

Location
- Country: Germany
- State: Mecklenburg-Vorpommern

Physical characteristics
- Mouth
  - location: Warnow
  - coordinates: 54°00′11″N 12°07′28″E

Basin features
- Progression: Warnow→ Baltic Sea

Zarnow is a river of Mecklenburg-Vorpommern, Germany. It flows into the Warnow between Schwaan and Rostock.

== See also ==
- List of rivers of Mecklenburg-Vorpommern
