= Schwinge (Peene) =

River in Germany

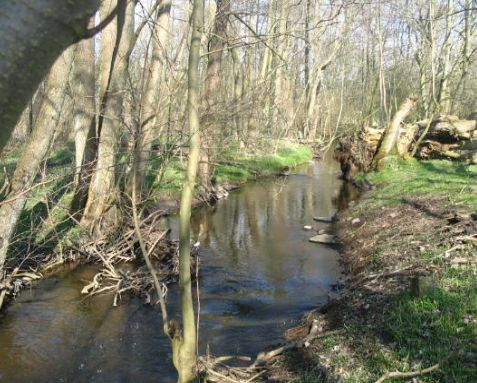

Location
- Country: Germany
- State: Mecklenburg-Vorpommern

Physical characteristics
- Mouth
  - location: Peene
  - coordinates: 53.9679°N 13.1669°E

Basin features
- Progression: Peene→ Baltic Sea

Schwinge is a river of Mecklenburg-Vorpommern, Germany. It is a left tributary of the Peene.

== See also ==
- List of rivers of Mecklenburg-Vorpommern
