= Augraben (Tollense) =

River in Germany

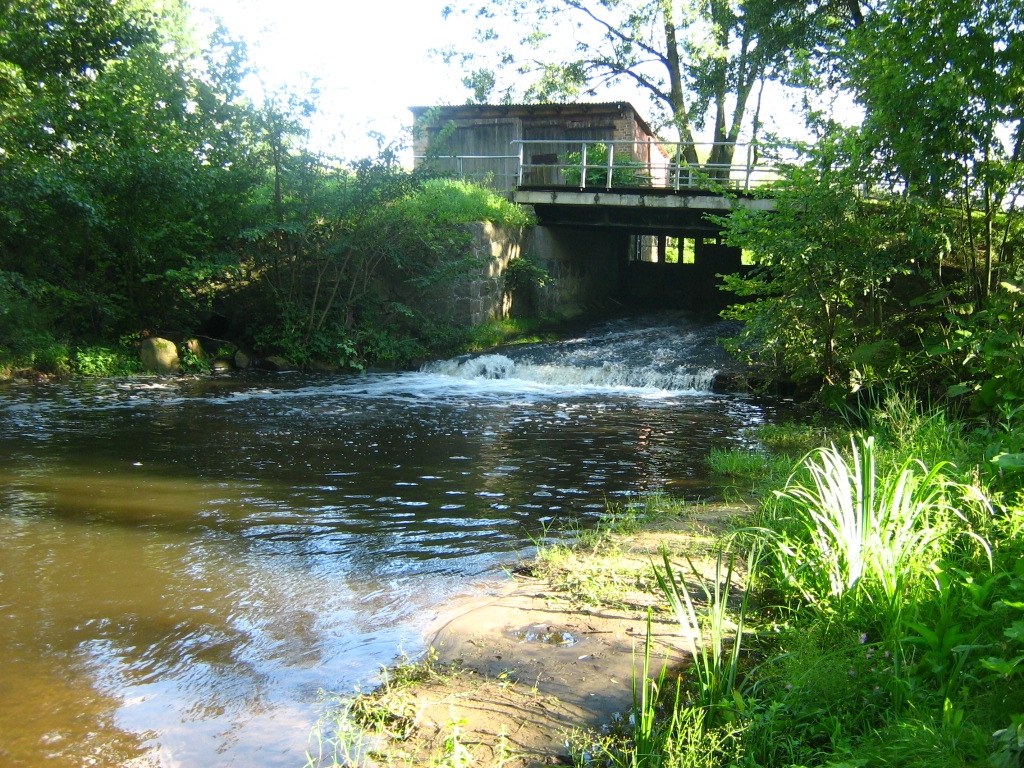

Location
- Country: Germany
- State: Mecklenburg-Vorpommern

Physical characteristics
- Mouth
  - location: Tollense
  - coordinates: 53.8964°N 13.0660°E

Basin features
- Progression: Tollense→ Peene→ Baltic Sea

The Augraben is a river in Mecklenburg-Vorpommern, Germany. It is a tributary of the Tollense river, which it joins near Demmin.

== See also ==
- List of rivers of Mecklenburg-Vorpommern
