= Nebel (river) =

River in Germany

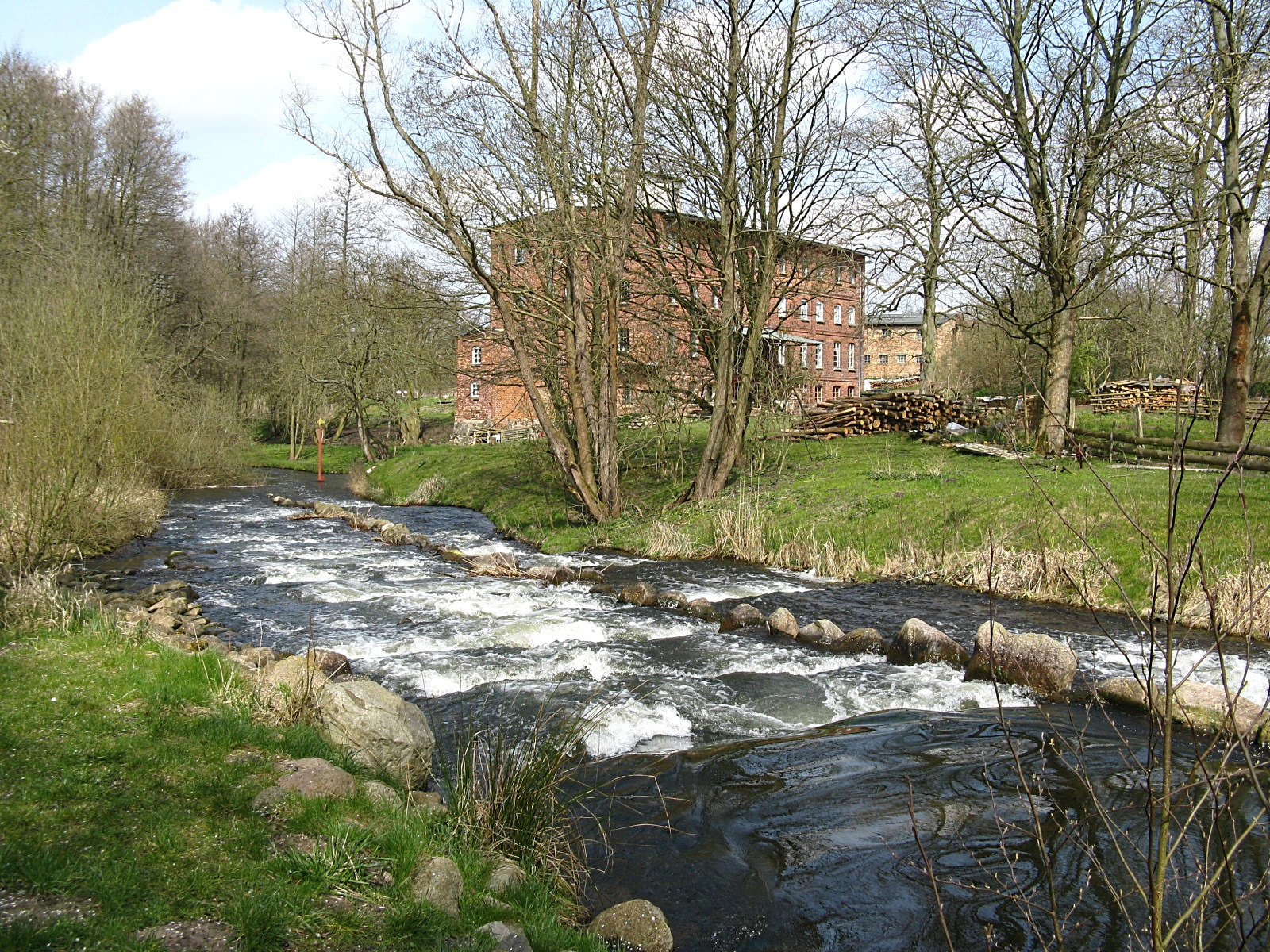
- Fish ladder near Hoppenrade

Location
- Country: Germany

Physical characteristics
- Source
  - location: Mecklenburg
- Mouth
  - location: Warnow
  - coordinates: 53°50′57″N 11°59′52″E
- Length: 60 km (37 mi)
- Basin size: 998 km^{2} (385 sq mi)

Basin features
- Progression: Warnow→ Baltic Sea

The Nebel (German pronunciation: [ˈneːbl̩]) is a river in Mecklenburg-Vorpommern, Germany. It is a 60 km long right tributary of the Warnow. It flows through Krakow am See and Güstrow, and joins the Warnow in Bützow.
