= Siggelkow =

- Municipality
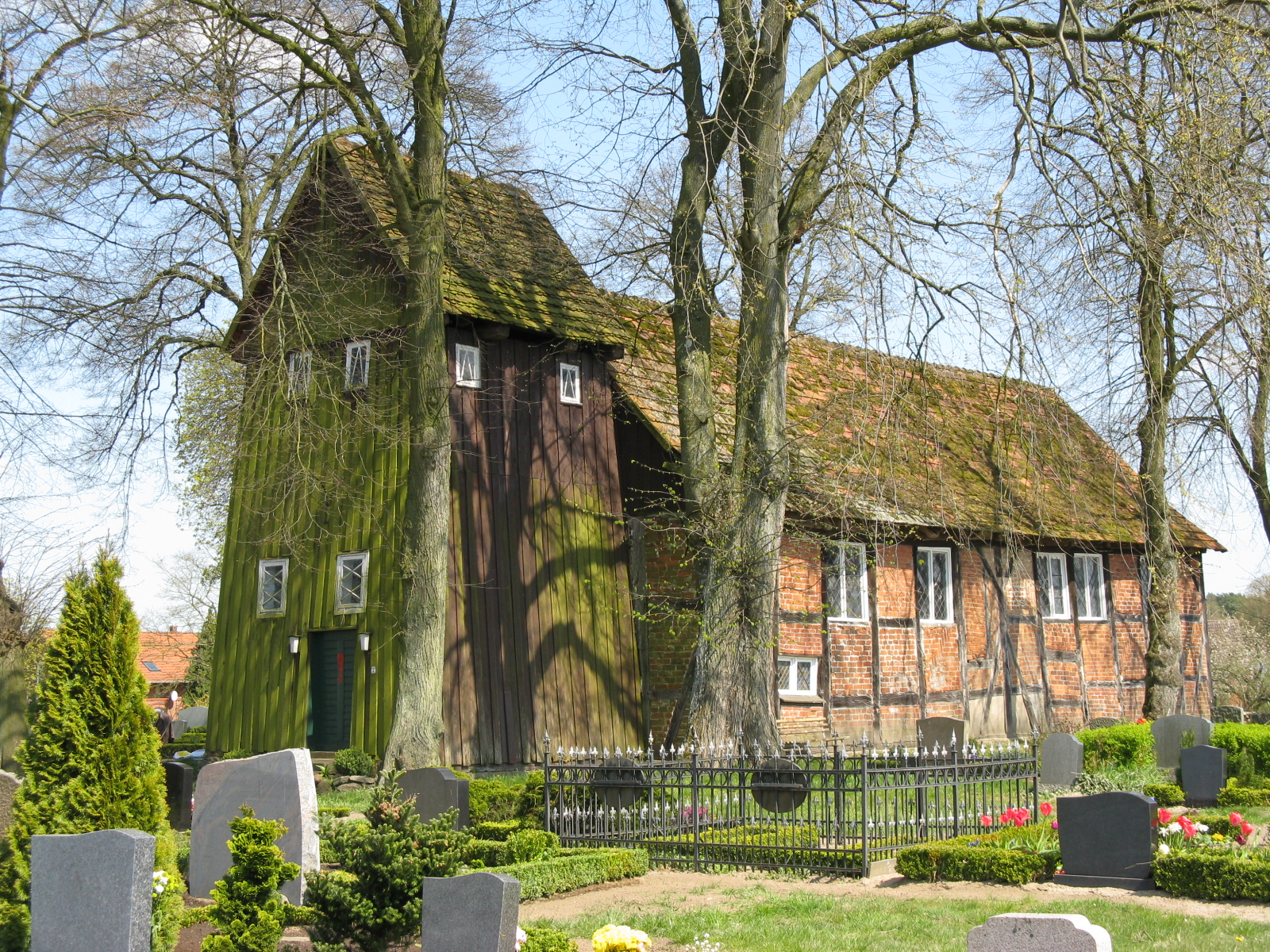
- Church

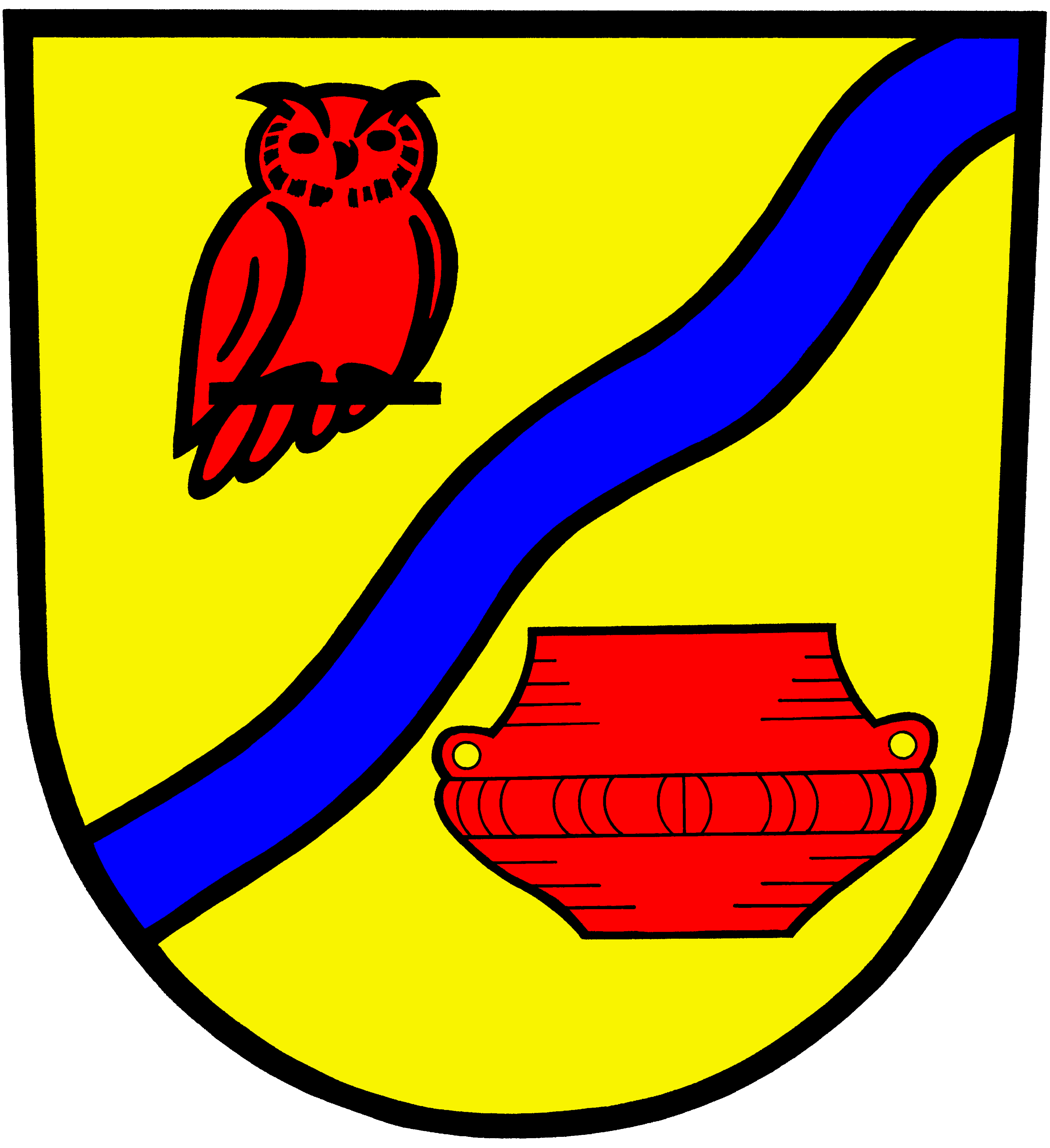
- Coat of arms

- Location of Siggelkow within Ludwigslust-Parchim district
- Interactive map of Siggelkow
- Location within Germany Location within Mecklenburg-Vorpommern
- Coordinates: 53°23′N 11°56′E
- Country: Germany
- State: Mecklenburg-Vorpommern
- District: Ludwigslust-Parchim
- Municipal assoc.: Eldenburg Lübz
- Subdivisions: 5

Government
  - Mayor: Angelika Lübcke

Area
  - Total: 54.85 km^{2} (21.18 sq mi)
- Elevation: 53 m (174 ft)

Population (2025-12-31)
  - Total: 820
  - Density: 15/km^{2} (39/sq mi)
- Time zone: UTC+01:00 (CET)
  - Summer (DST): UTC+02:00 (CEST)
- Postal codes: 19376
- Dialling codes: 038724
- Vehicle registration: PCH
- Website: Gemeinde Siggelkow

Siggelkow is a municipality in the Ludwigslust-Parchim district, in Mecklenburg-Vorpommern, Germany.
