= Elde =

River in northern Germany

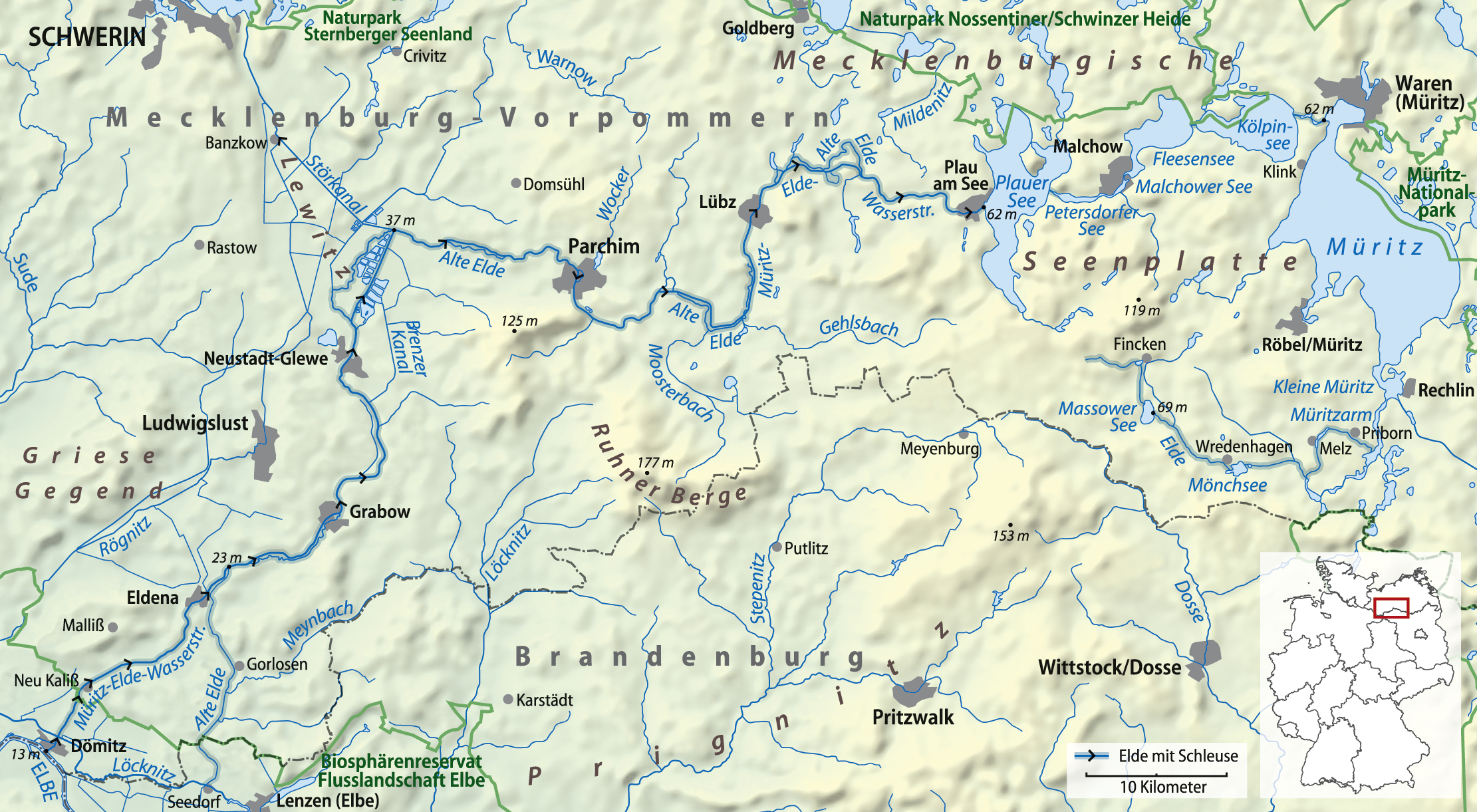

Location
- Country: Germany

Physical characteristics
- Source
  - location: Mecklenburg-Vorpommern
- Mouth
  - location: Elbe
  - coordinates: 53.1357°N 11.2504°E
- Length: 220 km (140 mi)

Basin features
- Progression: Elbe→ North Sea

The Elde (German pronunciation: [ˈɛldə]) is a river in northern Germany (Mecklenburg-Vorpommern and a few km in Brandenburg), a right tributary of the Elbe. Its total length is 220 kilometres (140 mi). The Elde originates near Altenhof, south of Malchow. It first flows southeast towards the southern end of Lake Müritz, which it enters at Vipperow. It flows out of the Müritz at its northern end, near Waren. It turns west, and flows through a series of small lakes, and along the town of Malchow, until the Plauer See. It flows out of the Plauer See at Plau am See, and continues west and southwest through Lübz, Parchim, Neustadt-Glewe, Grabow and Eldena, and flows into the Elbe at Dömitz. Near Eldena, the Alte Elde branches off and flows into the Löcknitz (another tributary of the Elbe) near Eldenburg, part of Lenzen (Elbe). For much of its length, 180 kilometres (110 mi), it forms the navigable Müritz-Elde-Wasserstraße, with 17 locks. The Elde is murky, due to the fast erosion of the valley around it.
