= Warnow =

River in Germany

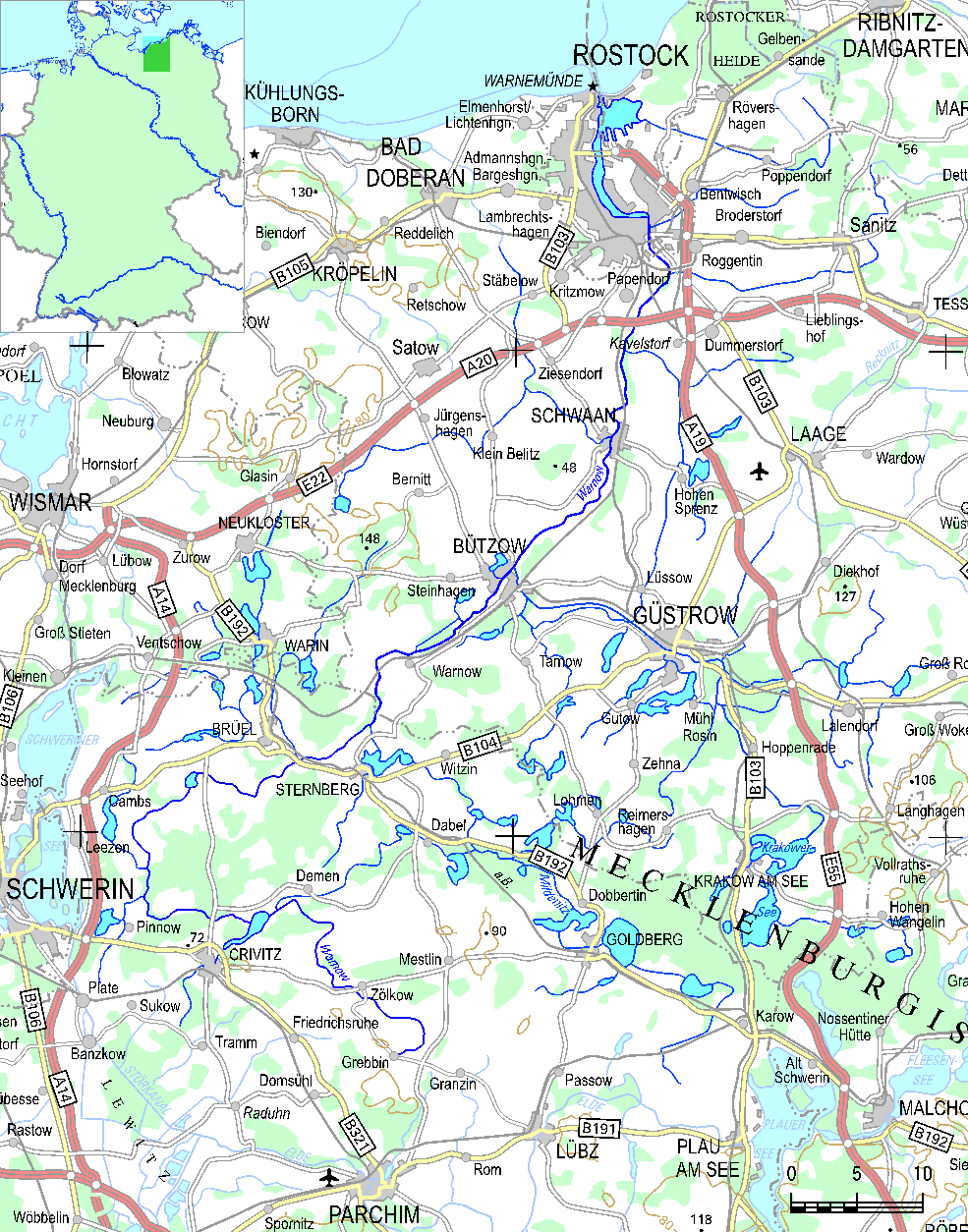

Location
- Country: Germany
- State: Mecklenburg-Vorpommern

Physical characteristics
- Source
  - location: Mecklenburg
- Mouth
  - location: Baltic Sea
  - coordinates: 54°10′54″N 12°5′32″E
- Length: 155.4 km (96.6 mi)
- Basin size: 3,324 km^{2} (1,283 mi^{2})

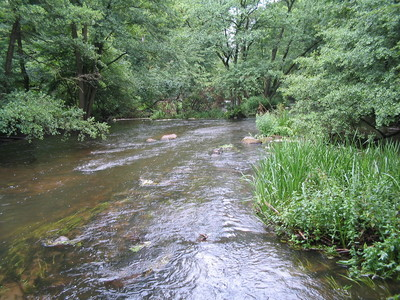
River Warnow in a valley

The Warnow (German pronunciation: [ˈvaʁno]) is a river in the state of Mecklenburg-Vorpommern in Germany. It flows into the Baltic Sea near the town of Rostock, in its borough Warnemünde.

The source of the Warnow is in Grebbin, a small village 10 kilometres (6 mi) north of Parchim, at the western end of the Mecklenburg Lake District. It flows north through Sternberg, Bützow and Schwaan before reaching Rostock.

In 2003, Germany's first modern toll road, the Warnow Tunnel was opened, connecting the port of Rostock on the east bank with the west bank of the river.

There is in Indaial, a city of Brazil, a river with the same name. When Hermann Blumenau came to America and started to explore the country, he gave this name to the river in the Brazilian city because it resembled the river in Germany.

== Names and etymology ==
The origins of the name are uncertain. Recent work suggests a non-Indo-European (perhaps specifically Hattic) element ar(i)n ('spring, stream'), giving rise to the Slavic form Warnow through the prosthesis of /v-/. The Warnabi, a medieval Slavic tribe, probably derived their name from the Warnow. The ancient geographer Claudius Ptolemäus mentioned a river around 150 CE whose location would correspond to the Warnow, which he called the Χαλοῦσος (Latin: Chalusus). The river also appears in a few medieval sources under names along the lines of Goderak: Guðakrsá ('God-field's river') in Knýtlinga saga chapter 119 and Saxo Grammaticus's Gesta Danorum in the phrase ad Gudacram amnem ('to the river Gudacra'; xiv.25.16). Meanwhile, Arnold of Lübeck's Chronica Slavorum mentions that Berno, Apostle of the Obotrites 'pro Gutdracco Godehardum episcopum venerari constituit' ('instituted the veneration of Bishop Godehard in place of Gutdracco'). This Gutdracco is otherwise unknown, and there is some suspicion that the name of this god arose as a folk-etymologisation of the name of the river.
