= Heinz Meynhardt =

German ethologist and wild boar specialist

Heinz Meynhardt (21 April 1935 – 27 October 1989) was an East German electrician, wildlife filmmaker, and ethologist. Apart from filming a range of wildlife in the Danube Delta, he became a specialist on wild boar after earning the trust of a sounder of boar among whom he spent time observing their behavior. He wrote a doctoral dissertation on the behavior of wild boar and received a doctorate in 1987, despite not having any graduate degrees. His work earned him the nicknames of "Schweine Meynhardt" ("Swine Meynhardt") and "Wildschwein ehrenhalber" ("Honorary wildboar").

== Life and work ==
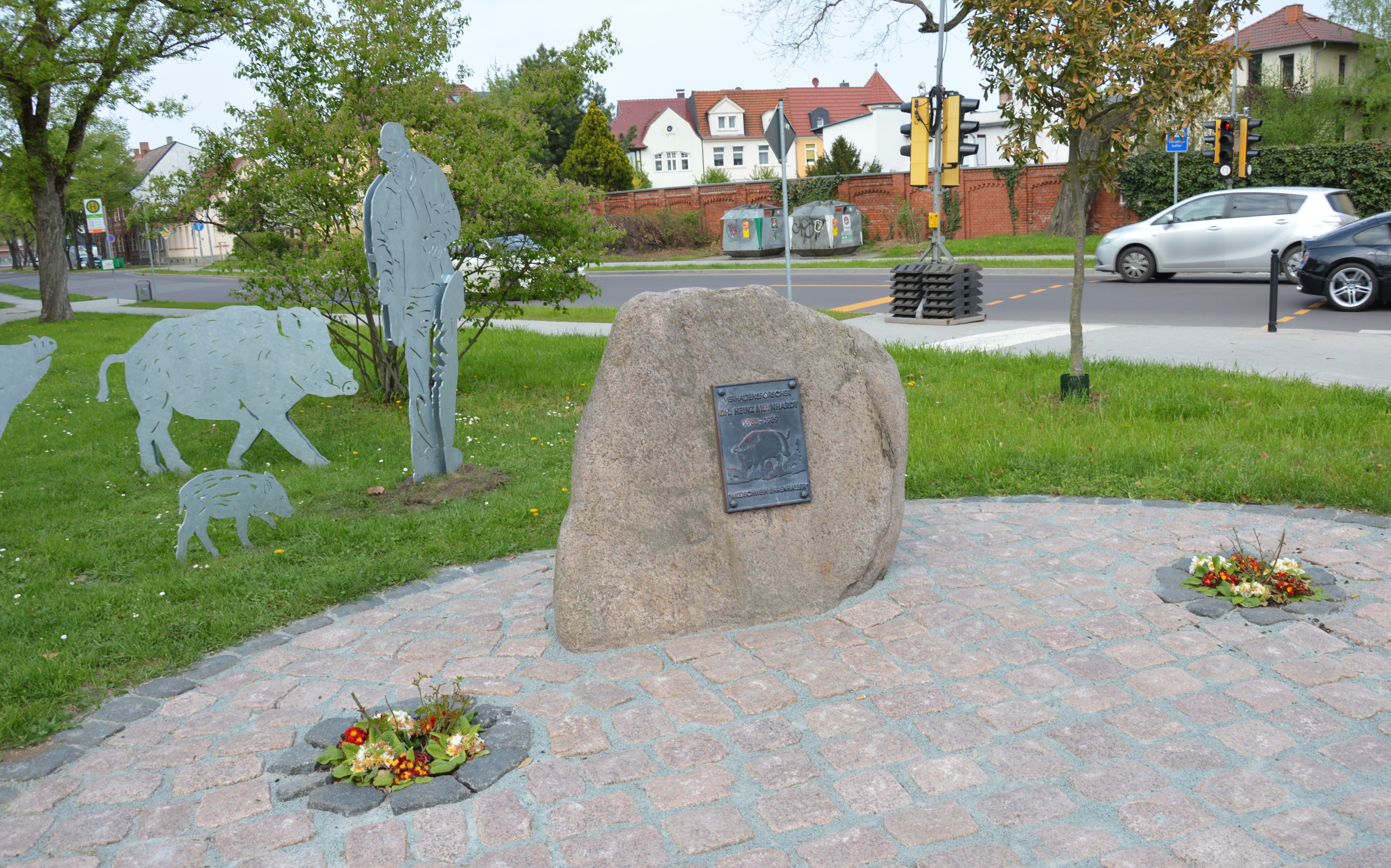
Memorial to Meynhardt in Burg

Meynhardt was born in Burg, the son of a butcher. As a school boy he had an interest in wildlife and kept birds at home. After school he apprenticed as an electrician from 1949 to 1952 and became a master electrician in 1954. He worked for a small business becoming its manager. In his spare time he observed wildlife and began to study wild boar. He also bred black swans, parrots and dogs. He became a friend of the veterinarian Ulrich Weber. He went into forests and became a friend of Edmund Endert and the forester Rudolf Meseberg of Grabow who helped him in early years. Meseburg fed wild boars with kitchen scraps and the animals had become used to him. Meynhardt continued this feeding, taking food in his red Lada which the animals recognized and waited for. He studied a sounder of pigs which tolerated him and allowed him to observe from close range. He was even able to observe a sow giving birth to piglets. In 1975 he was supported by the Institute of Forestry in Eberswalde to produce films on the life of wild boar. His film on the wild boar which was shown on German television in 1977 gained international recognition. Meynhardt was a member of the LDPD from 1977. His films were seen widely outside East Germany and brought foreign money which may have allowed him to travel out of the country. He visited Africa for three months and met Jane Goodall who was conducting her studies. In 1980 he received a Leibniz Medal. In 1985 he made a film on wildlife in Australia and gave lectures around Europe including in West Germany, France and Switzerland. He received a doctorate for his studies on the biology of wild boar from the University of Leipzig in 1987 with a dissertation on the behavior of European Wild Boar and feral domestic pigs with information useful for pig production. He collapsed while giving a lecture in France and died from a brain tumour just weeks before the fall of the Berlin Wall.

Meynhardt brought the rise of wild boar in East Germany into public consciousness. After major declines due to hunting the population bounced back and he considered it a national conservation success. He made several popular films and also wrote several books including Das Jahr der Wildschweine (1989), Mein leben unter Wildschweinen (1984). Meynhardt suggested that dominant sows suppressed the breeding of others in the sounder and that there was synchrony in breeding between sounders. Both these ideas are no longer considered valid. Instead nutritional condition is now thought to be responsible for deciding the sexual maturity and reproduction.

A "Heinz Meynhardt" circle of friends established a memorial in 2011 for him in Burg with a plaque on a boulder that reads Wildschwein ehrenhalber ("Honorary Wild Boar") and steel cutouts of him and wild boars.
