= Oskar Kurz =

German local historian (1896–1945)

- Born: September 10, 1895; Rawitsch, Province of Posen, Kingdom of Prussia, German Empire
- Died: May 5, 1945 (aged 49); Grabow, Gau Mecklenburg, Nazi Germany (under Soviet occupation)
- Cause of death: Suicide
- Known for: Founding the Grabow museum Local history research

Oskar Kurz (10 September 1896 – 5 May 1945) was a German Studienrat and local historian who is primarily known for founding the town museum of Grabow in 1934.

== Early life ==
Kurz was born on 10 September 1896 in Rawitsch (now Rawicz). He studied at the universities of Berlin and Marburg. In 1920, Kurz was appointed as the Studienrat of the Realschule Grabow.

== Work ==
Kurz is considered to be one of the most important local historians of Grabow. While his primary interests were toponymy of the local Flurnamen and the history of agricultural associations in the region, most of his works were concerned with the whole local history of Grabow. His most well known book is Grabow in Kriegszeiten und als Garnison 1619-1918, released in 1937.

In 1934, Kurz founded the town museum of Grabow. While its initial primary goal was the exhibition of local crafts, it also included exhibitions on the fate of the ducal palace and the town history as a whole. Only a few days after the end of World War II, during May 1945, the museum established by Oskar Kurz burnt down and almost all pieces therein were destroyed. One year later, in 1946, Dr. Willy Havemann began compiling a new collection that would first be presented to the public in 1952 and forms the basis of the town's modern museum.

Kurz has been noted as a nationalist and an antisemite. He also founded and lead the local branch of the Volkssturm.

== Death ==
Kurz committed suicide on 5 May 1945, two days before Germany's capitulation in World War II, while Grabow was under Soviet military occupation.

== Selected publications ==
- Der große Brand von Grabow 1725 und der Wiederaufbau der Stadt. Grabow: Verlag Ernst-Karl Geier, 1931
- In: Sonderdruck der Mecklenburgischen Monatshefte. (11th ed.), Rostock: Carl Hinstorff-Verlag, 1935
  - Ein Blick ins Grabower Heimatmuseum
  - Grabows Stadtbild im Wandel der Zeit
  - Reuter und Grabow
- Grabow in Kriegszeiten und als Garnison 1619-1918, 1937
- Das Fachwerk in Grabow, in: Mecklenburgische Monatshefte. (13th ed.), Rostock: Carl Hinstorff-Verlag, 1937
- Von alten Grabower Festen, in: Zeitschrift des Heimatbundes Mecklenburg (34th ed.), 1939 (3/4)

== Bibliography ==
- Madus, Christian (1999). Grabow. Geschichte und Gegenwart (2nd ed.). Schwerin: Stock & Stein. ISBN 978-3-932370-49-6
