= Grabower Süsswaren =

German food company based in Grabow

Grabower Süsswaren GmbH
- Type: GmbH
- Industry: Food Processing
- Founder: Johann Bollhagen
- Headquarters: Grabow (Ludwigslust-Parchim), Germany
- Area served: Worldwide
- Key people: Simone Koltzau (General Manager), Otto Lithardt (General Manager), Claus-Peter Rochlitz (General Manager)
- Owner: Biscuit International
- Website: http://www.grabower.de/ (archived)

Grabower Süsswaren is a German food company based in Grabow. It was founded in 1835 by Johann Bollhagen as a bakery that produced pretzels, waffles and pepper nuts. In 1902 it was taken over by Gustav Ritter, who expanded the sales area and began exporting.

In 1951 the company was nationalized as VEB Grabower Dauerbackwaren. The main products produced were chocolate covered marshmallows and pastries.

In 1991, the Schiesser-Group took over the company, reduced the product range to only chocolate covered marshmallows and automated the production processes. Due to the problems in implementing automation, Grabower ran into difficulties and had to file for bankruptcy in 1996. Since 1996, it has been managed by Otto and Monika Lithardt, modernizing the company and increasing profit from 5 million Euros in 1996 to 145 million Euros in 2006.

Grabower produces a range of biscuits and cakes. The company exports products to roughly 50 countries and offers private-label production services. As of June 2010 they have joined the Continental Bakeries group.

Lithard expanded the company through further acquisitions to form the Grabower confectionery group. Pastries, chocolate covered marshmallows, waffle marshmallows and crispbread were produced at the Grabow, Arnstadt, Prichsenstadt, Kühren-Burkartshain and Herten locations. In 2010, the group generated annual sales of over 100 million euros with 650 employees, including around 230 in the Grabow main plant.

In 2010, Grabower Süsswaren GmbH was taken over by Continental Bakeries along with several other Lithard acquisitions. On 12 September 2012, Wolf Süßwaren GmbH from Arnstadt was merged into Grabower Süsswaren GmbH. Continental Bakeries, which owned Grabower Süsswaren, was acquired by Biscuit International in 2022.
