= Wanzlitz Ausbau =

Ausbau of Wanzlitz in the town of Grabow

Coordinates: 53°14′50″N 11°29′47″E

Wanzlitz Ausbau is an Ausbau in the ortsteil and Gemarkung of Wanzlitz within the municipality of Grabow in the Ludwigslust-Parchim district of Mecklenburg-Vorpommern, Germany. It is located on the paved Ausbau Wanzlitz road that is a continuation of the Wanzlitzer Dorfstraße in the village of Wanzlitz proper. Wanzlitz Ausbau, which is actually administratively split between the municipalities of Grabow and Eldena, consists of a pig farm with a biogas facility, the Mastbetrieb Hopman, and the Gewerbepark Wanzlitz, which primarily consists of storage units. The latter is split by the administrative boundary but lies primarily within the municipality of Eldena. It is serviced by a bus stop.

As a commercial area, Wanzlitz Ausbau does not have any permanent population.
