= Walter Bötcher =

German politician (1898–1981)

Mayor of Grabow
- In office 1931–1945
- Preceded by: Werner Siegismund
- Succeeded by: Edgar Stafels

Oberstadtdirektor of Lüneburg
- In office 1955–1963
- Preceded by: Hans Heinrich Stelljes
- Succeeded by: Werner Bockelmann

Personal details
- Born: 27 November 1898 Constance, Grand Duchy of Baden, German Empire
- Died: 4 January 1981 (aged 82)
- Party: Free Democratic Party; Nazi Party (1937–1945); German People's Party (until 1937)
- Occupation: Jurist, mayor, city manager

Dr. Walter Albert Alwin Bötcher (27 November 1898 – 4 January 1981) was a German jurist and politician who served as the mayor of Grabow and in the city administration of post-war Lüneburg.

== Biography ==
Bötcher was born in Constance on 27 November 1898 and grew up in Lüneburg.

A veteran of World War I, Bötcher joined the German People's Party (DVP) and was elected mayor of Grabow in 1931, as which he continued to serve until 1945. In August 1933, Bötcher joined the Sturmabteilung and in 1937, the NSDAP. Although remaining the mayor of Grabow throughout World War II, Bötcher frequently went to serve on the front lines (August to October 1940, June to October 1941, January 1942 to January 1943) as an officer. Whenever away for service, he would be replaced by Max Rudolf Dünnebier as acting mayor. In May 1945, Bötcher became a British prisoner of war and was deposed as the mayor of Grabow that same year by the Soviet military administration.

After World War II, Bötcher joined the Free Democratic Party (FDP) and became the financial administrator (Stadtkämmerer) of Lüneburg, a position in which he served from October 1946 until becoming Lüneburg's city manager (Oberstadtdirektor) as which he served until retirement on 1 November 1963. During his tenure he advocated for the maintenance of the city's historic buildings, oversaw the 1000-year anniversary of the city in 1956, and built a now-controversial World War II monument. Multiple cases of arson were recorded in the city after 1945, including during Bötcher's tenure, which led to increased security measures in the city. One of these security measures, a guard dog (Airedale Terrier) at the Lüneburg town hall, would attack Bötcher in 1960.

Bötcher died on 4 January 1981.

== Legacy ==
The Walter-Bötcher-Straße in Lüneburg is named after him.

== Publications ==
- Lüneburger Skizzen: Eine Stadt und ihre Bürger, 1956
