= Kathleen Bartels =

Incumbent mayor of Grabow, Germany

- Bartels on stage at the 2026 state harvest festival in Grabow

Mayor of Grabow
- Incumbent
- Assumed office 21 October 2018
- Preceded by: Stefan Sternberg

Personal details
- Born: 1980 (age 45–46)
- Party: Social Democratic Party of Germany

Kathleen Bartels (born 1980) is a German local politician who has served as the mayor of Grabow since 2018. She succeeded Stefan Sternberg, who became the Landrat of Ludwigslust-Parchim, when she was elected with an absolute majority of 54.82% in the first round. Manuela Schwesig, minister-president of Mecklenburg-Vorpommern, congratulated Bartels. Bartels is a member of the Social Democratic Party of Germany (SPD), but was also supported by The Left and the voters' association Starkes Grabow in the 2018 election. During her first tenure, Bartels supported the construction of the controversial "Businesspark Eldetal" in the Grabow forest. She also helped organize the Summer of Pioneers in Grabow, which she later described as a "high point" of her tenure.

Bartels was reelected as the mayor of Grabow on 11 May 2025 again winning in the first round with 52% of the vote. She was supported by the voters' association Starkes Grabow during the 2025 election.
