= Willi Fründt =

German communist executed by the Nazis

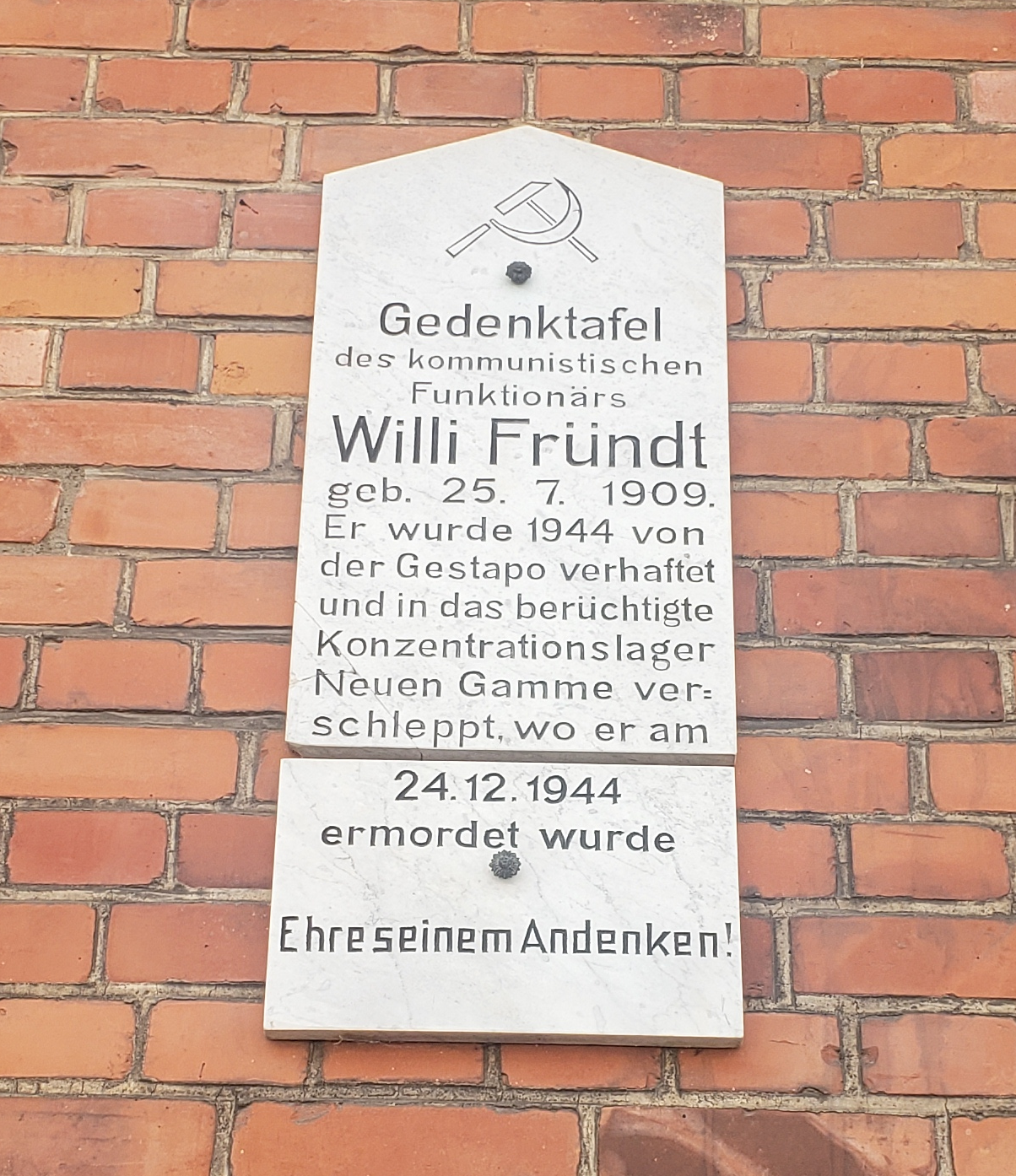
- Born: July 25, 1909; Grabow, Grand Duchy of Mecklenburg-Schwerin, German Empire
- Died: December 24, 1944 (aged 35); Neuengamme concentration camp, Hamburg, Nazi Germany
- Political party: Communist Party of Germany

Willi Fründt (25 July 1909 – 24 December 1944) was a German communist functionary from Grabow who was arrested by the Nazis as a result of Aktion Gitter after the failed 20 July plot.

== Life ==
Fründt was born on 25 July 1909 in Grabow. He had two brothers, Karl and Otto Fründt, with whom he became involved in the Communist Party of Germany (KPD) from a young age, engaging in confrontations with the Nazis during the Weimar Republic. He worked as a watchmaker and continued his activism after 1933 through talking about politics with his customers as well as illegally distributing flyers in the town.

The zeitzeuge Ingeborg Siegmund noted that Fründt often came to the Ziegelscheune inn where the community of Grabow frequently met for casual conversation (Klöschnack).

He was arrested on 20 July 1944 as a result of Aktion Gitter after the failed 20 July plot to assassinate Adolf Hitler. Following his arrest, Fründt was interned first at the Zuchthaus Dreibergen-Bützow from which he was transferred to the Neuengamme concentration camp where he was executed on 24 December 1944.

== Legacy ==
Two roads, one in Grabow and one in Prislich, were named after Fründt and a plaque commemorating him was installed by the road in Grabow.
