= Grabow =

Town in Mecklenburg-Vorpommern, Germany

- Town
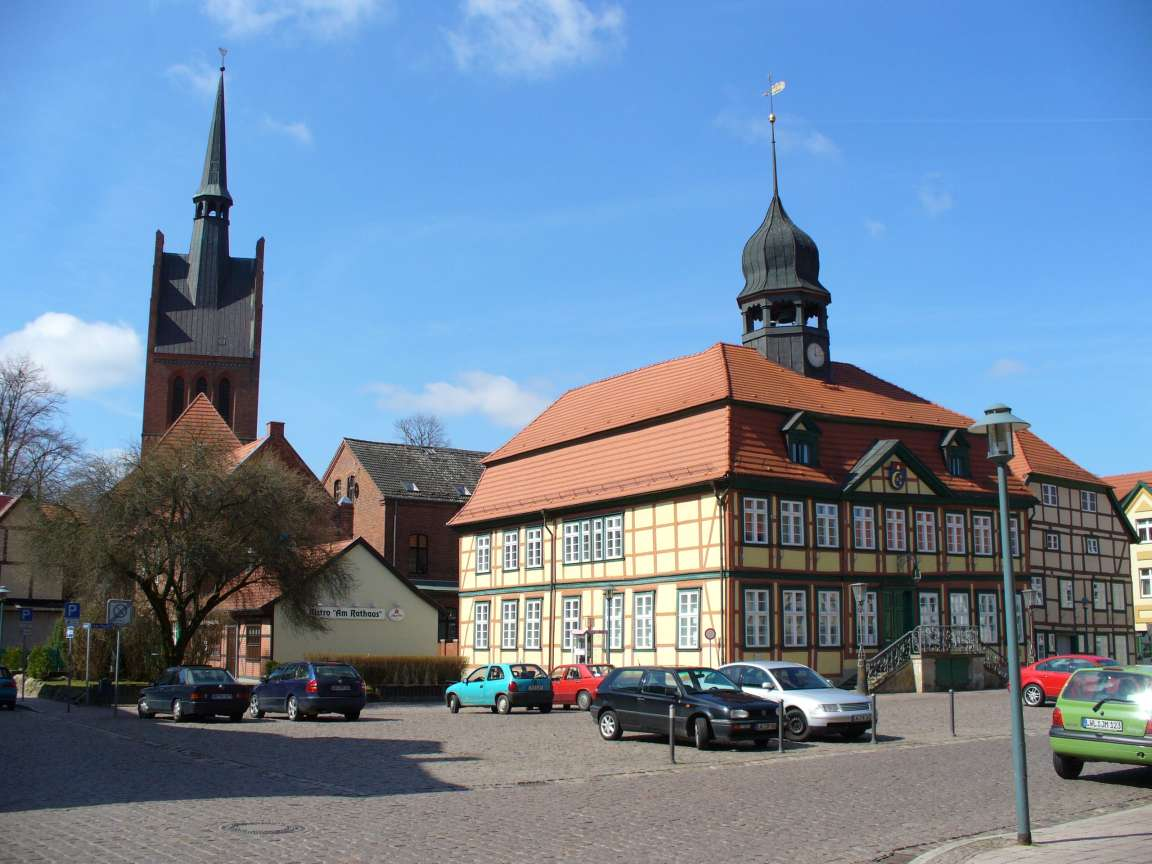
- Town hall and marketplace with St. Georgs church in the background

- Flag Coat of arms

- Location of Grabow within Ludwigslust-Parchim district
- Interactive map of Grabow
- Location within Germany Location within Mecklenburg-Vorpommern
- Coordinates: 53°16′N 11°34′E
- Country: Germany
- State: Mecklenburg-Vorpommern
- District: Ludwigslust-Parchim
- Municipal assoc.: Grabow

Government
  - Mayor: Kathleen Bartels (SPD)

Area
  - Total: 72.27 km^{2} (27.90 sq mi)
- Elevation: 26 m (85 ft)

Population (2025-12-31)
  - Total: 5,358
  - Density: 74.14/km^{2} (192.0/sq mi)
- Time zone: UTC+01:00 (CET)
  - Summer (DST): UTC+02:00 (CEST)
- Postal codes: 19300
- Dialling codes: 038756
- Vehicle registration: LWL, LUP
- Website: www.grabow.de

Grabow (German pronunciation: [ˈɡʁaːboː]) is a town in the Ludwigslust-Parchim district of Mecklenburg-Vorpommern, Germany. The town lies 7 kilometres (4.3 mi) southeast of Ludwigslust, the next city, and has the river Elde passing through its old town which is characterized by 16th century timber-framed architecture. Additionally, Grabow is a member and the seat of the Amt Grabow collective municipality as well as being a part of the Hamburg Metropolitan Region. Historically, Grabow was home to a royal residence where some monarchs of the Mecklenburg line were born.

== Etymology ==
The name Grabow is of Slavic Polabian origin, with grab meaning "hornbeam". Names of the same root are common in the area. Its name only slightly changed over time as with the town being known as Grabowe (1186, 1252, 1275) and Grabow (1189, 1298).

In contemporary times, Grabow is also referred to as Grabow (Elde) or Grabow in Mecklenburg, shortened to Grabow i. M. or Grabow (Meckl), to differentiate it from other settlements of the same name, with the latter being used in the official name of the Grabow (Meckl) train station.

== Geography ==
Grabow is located within the Griese Gegend region of southern Mecklenburg, specifically the historical Land Grabow and, by some definitions, the historical Land Wehningen region. The municipal territory is characterized by the river Elde and its valley as well as the scenic landscape forest landscape which surrounds the town itself and covers a majority of its core municipal territory at an area of 1,658 hectares (4,100 acres) or 16.58 square kilometres (6.40 sq mi). Grabow is located relatively close to the Prignitz region and district within the state of Brandenburg, but has historically never been part of either.

The town is situated on the river Elde, which flows through the old town split between the New and Old Elde, forming an island. The river bisects the core municipal territory from northeast to southwest, leaving the territory with a characteristic river valley used for agriculture. Besides Grabow itself, the hinterland settlements of Fresenbrügge and Hechtsforthschleuse are also located on the Elde's banks. Just north of the old town, the Old Elde splits off into the Fabikkanal which forms the mouth of the Mühlenbach creek that enters the municipality from the east, originating in the bordering municipality of Prislich. Southeast of the old town island lies the Schlossinsel (also known as Amtsinsel) that used to be home to the Grabow Schloss before the Great Fire of 1725, nowadays the island is usually inaccessible private property.

Grabow lies 7 kilometres (4.3 mi) southeast of the next town Ludwigslust and 40 kilometres (25 mi) southeast of the state capital Schwerin. The town is roughly 26 kilometres (16 mi) upstream (via the Elde) of Dömitz, which lies on the Elbe. Other nearby towns include Lenzen (Elbe) and Wittenberge in Brandenburg that are located roughly 20 kilometres (12 mi) and 34 kilometres (21 mi) from Grabow respectively.

Grabow's municipal territory has an area of 72.27 square kilometres (27.90 sq mi) and is subdivided into 8 ortsteile of which one is Grabow itself while the other seven are smaller hinterland villages. Since 1 January 2016, Grabow has an exclave to its south after the town annexed the former municipality of Steesow (including the villages of Bochin and Zuggelrade as well as the Gemarkung Holdseelen). This exclave, which is separated from Grabow by about 15 kilometres (9.3 mi) and two other municipalities, Gorlosen and Milow, is the only part of Grabow's municipal territory that directly borders the state of Brandenburg. Despite its relative proximity, Grabow's core territory is otherwise separated from the state border with Brandenburg by roughly 2.5 kilometres (1.6 mi) and the municipality of Kremmin.

Grabow's core territory is bordered by Groß Laasch to the north, Muchow and Zierzow to the northeast, Prislich to the east, Kremmin to the southeast, Gorlosen to the south, Eldena to the southwest, as well as Karstädt and Ludwigslust to the west. The exclave Steesow is bordered by Milow to the north, Karstädt in the state of Brandenburg to the northeast, and Lenzen (Elbe) in Brandenburg to the south.

=== Subdivisions ===
Besides the main town itself, the municipality of Grabow includes several outlying villages in its hinterland. Seven of which are recognized ortsteile.

Map	Ortsteil	Settlements	Population (Note: Most figures are estimates derived from data provided by the 2022 German census. Some numbers are from different years, sometimes severely outdated. All figures may not properly add up.)	
	Grabow	Grabow	5,080	5,097
	Grabow	Giermoor	0	5,097
	Grabow	Hechtsforthschleuse	12	5,097
	Grabow	Ziegelscheune	5	5,097
	Bochin		73	
	Fresenbrügge	Fresenbrügge	58	
	Fresenbrügge	Neu Fresenbrügge	58	
	Fresenbrügge	Schleuse	58	
	Heidehof		11	
	Steesow	Steesow	113	113
	Steesow	Holdseelen	0	113
	Wanzlitz	Wanzlitz	87	87
	Wanzlitz	Wanzlitz Ausbau	0	87
	Winkelmoor		10	
	Zuggelrade		13	

On 1 July 1950, the former municipalities of Fresenbrügge (incl. Neu Fresenbrügge & Schleuse) and Wanzlitz (incl. Ausbau) were annexed into Grabow.

On 1 January 2016, the former municipality of Steesow (incl. Bochin and Zuggelrade as well as Holdseelen) was annexed into Grabow despite being separated by 15 kilometres (9.3 mi) and two other municipalities, Gorlosen and Milow, thus forming an exclave.

=== Transportation ===
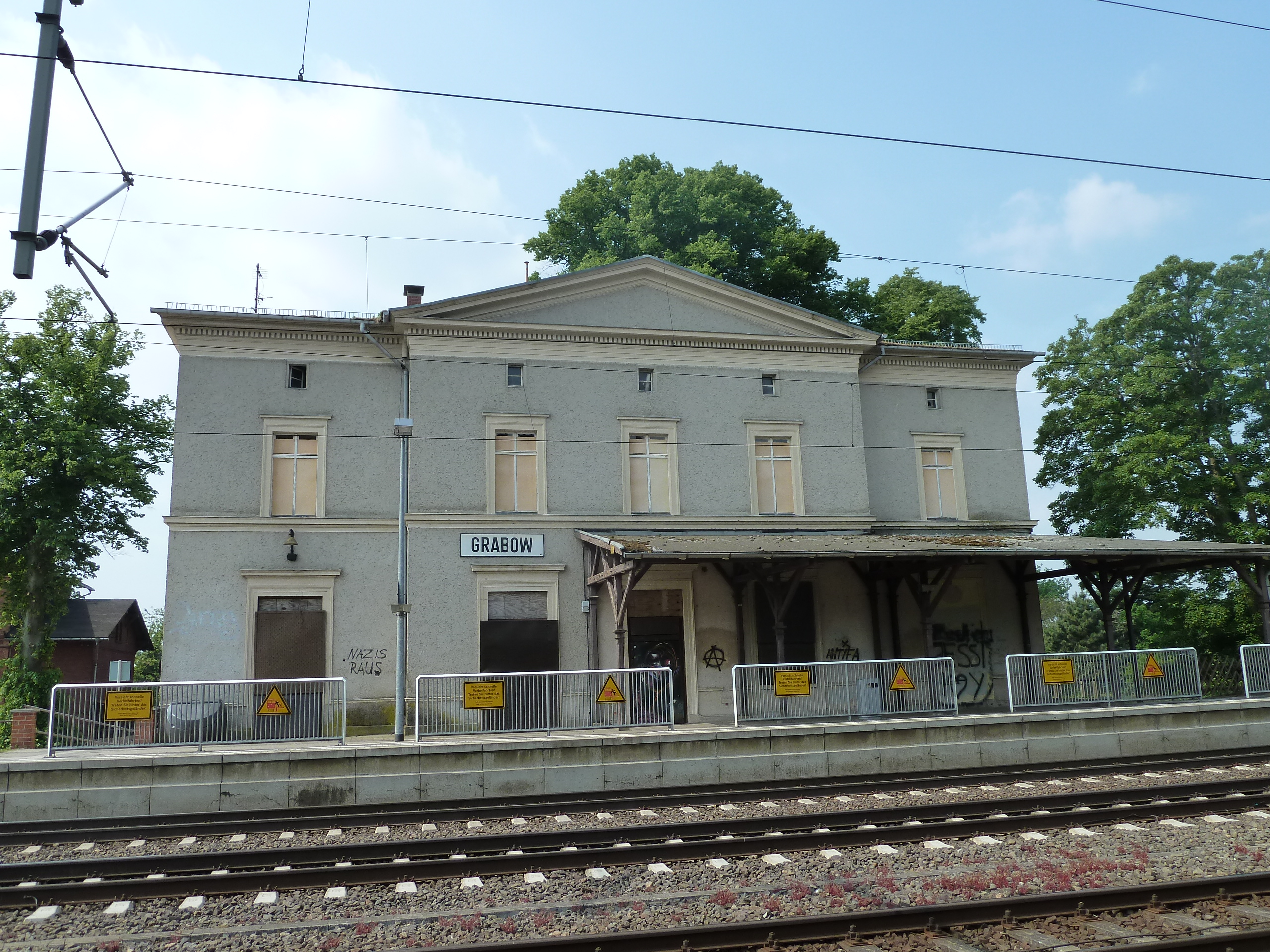
Grabow (Meckl) station

Grabow lies on the Berlin–Hamburg railway, which bisects the municipal territory from east to west, and is serviced by the RE8 Regionalbahn via the Grabow (Meckl) station. The RE8 connects Grabow to Wismar on the Baltic Sea coast and, via the federal capital Berlin, Elsterwerda in southwestern Brandenburg. In the direction of travel from Wismar to Elsterwerda, the station on the line directly before Grabow is Ludwigslust while the station directly after it is Karstädt.

The town's bus terminal is the stop Grabow Binnung which is located just south of the old town island and about 750 metres (2,460 ft) southwest of the train station. It is serviced by five bus lines that are operated by the Verkehrsgesellschaft Ludwigslust-Parchim (VLP), with the 590 in regular service to Ludwigslust primarily serving as a de facto school bus. Other lines connect outlying villages to the town but are only in semi-regular service with a large focus instead being placed on the VLP's Rufbus system.

From north to south, Grabow's municipal territory is bisected by two major roads that lie to the west of the main town itself: the A14 federal highway, which lies roughly 2 kilometres (1.2 mi) to the west of the town; and the L072 state road (also known as Ludwigsluster Chaussee), which bisects the town itself to the west and connects it to Ludwigslust in the north. The latter road is connected not only to lesser roads in the town but also to the aforementioned A14 highway via an interchange that is located in the northwest, just outside of the municipal territory. The L08 state road, which connects the B321 in Marnitz with Lenzen (Elbe) in the state of Brandenburg, bisects the town itself from east to west, only about 150 metres (490 ft) south of the old town island. It is known as Marnitzer Straße in the east, Prislicher Straße closer to the centre, and Binnung in the centre-west of the town before merging into the L072 for about 600 metres (2,000 ft) until again separating into the Lenzener Chausee south of the town itself. The L08 continues south through Milow until reaching the exclave of Steesow, which it bisects from north to south, connecting the villages of Steesow itself and Bochin to Grabow.

Grabow's old town has a small harbour (Stadthafen Grabow) on the Elde which is also home to a motorhome stopover (German: Wohnmobilstellplatz). An even smaller harbour, the Wasserwanderrastplatz Fresenbrügge, exists downstream in the hinterland village of Fresenbrügge which also serves as a motorhome pitch.

=== Climate ===
Climate data for Grabow (2018–2026 normals)
Month	Jan	Feb	Mar	Apr	May	Jun	Jul	Aug	Sep	Oct	Nov	Dec	Year
Mean daily maximum °C (°F)	3 (37)	4 (39)	8 (46)	13 (55)	18 (64)	21 (70)	23 (73)	22 (72)	18 (64)	13 (55)	7 (45)	4 (39)	13 (55)
Daily mean °C (°F)	1 (34)	1 (34)	4 (39)	9 (48)	13 (55)	16 (61)	18 (64)	18 (64)	14 (57)	9 (48)	5 (41)	2 (36)	9 (48)
Mean daily minimum °C (°F)	−2 (28)	−2 (28)	1 (34)	4 (39)	8 (46)	11 (52)	13 (55)	13 (55)	9 (48)	6 (43)	2 (36)	0 (32)	5 (41)
Average precipitation mm (inches)	31.1 (1.22)	25.5 (1.00)	27.8 (1.09)	26.8 (1.06)	36.2 (1.43)	46.8 (1.84)	49.1 (1.93)	43.6 (1.72)	37.0 (1.46)	34.0 (1.34)	34.3 (1.35)	35.5 (1.40)	427.7 (16.84)
Average precipitation days	6.4	5.5	6.3	5.7	7.0	8.2	9.2	8.3	6.8	7.2	7.2	7.2	85
Average snowy days	0.8	0.5	0.2	0.0	0.0	0.0	0.0	0.0	0.0	0.0	0.2	0.6	2.3
Source: Weather Spark

== History ==
Historical affiliations
- County of Dannenberg (1186–1319/20)
- Duchy of Mecklenburg (1320–1471)
- County of Schwerin (1234–1471)
- Duchy of Mecklenburg (1471–1520)
- Duchy of Mecklenburg-Schwerin (1520–1695)
- Duchy of Mecklenburg (1695–1701)
- Duchy of Mecklenburg-Schwerin (1701–1815)
- Grand Duchy of Mecklenburg-Schwerin (1815–1866)
- North German Confederation (1866–1871)
- German Empire (1871–1918)
- Weimar Republic (1918–1933)
- Nazi Germany (1933–1945)
- Soviet Occupation Zone (1945–1949)
- East Germany (1949–1990)
- Germany (1990–present)

In a letter from 23 February 1186, Pope Urban III mentioned a castle in Grabow and that the settlement belongs to the County of Dannenberg. Grabow received town privileges in 1252 from the Count of Dannenberg. A church in Grabow was first mentioned in 1285.

Since 1319/20, Grabow has been a part of Mecklenburg under first the Duchy and then the Grand Duchy of Mecklenburg-Schwerin, under which it was incorporated into the German Empire.

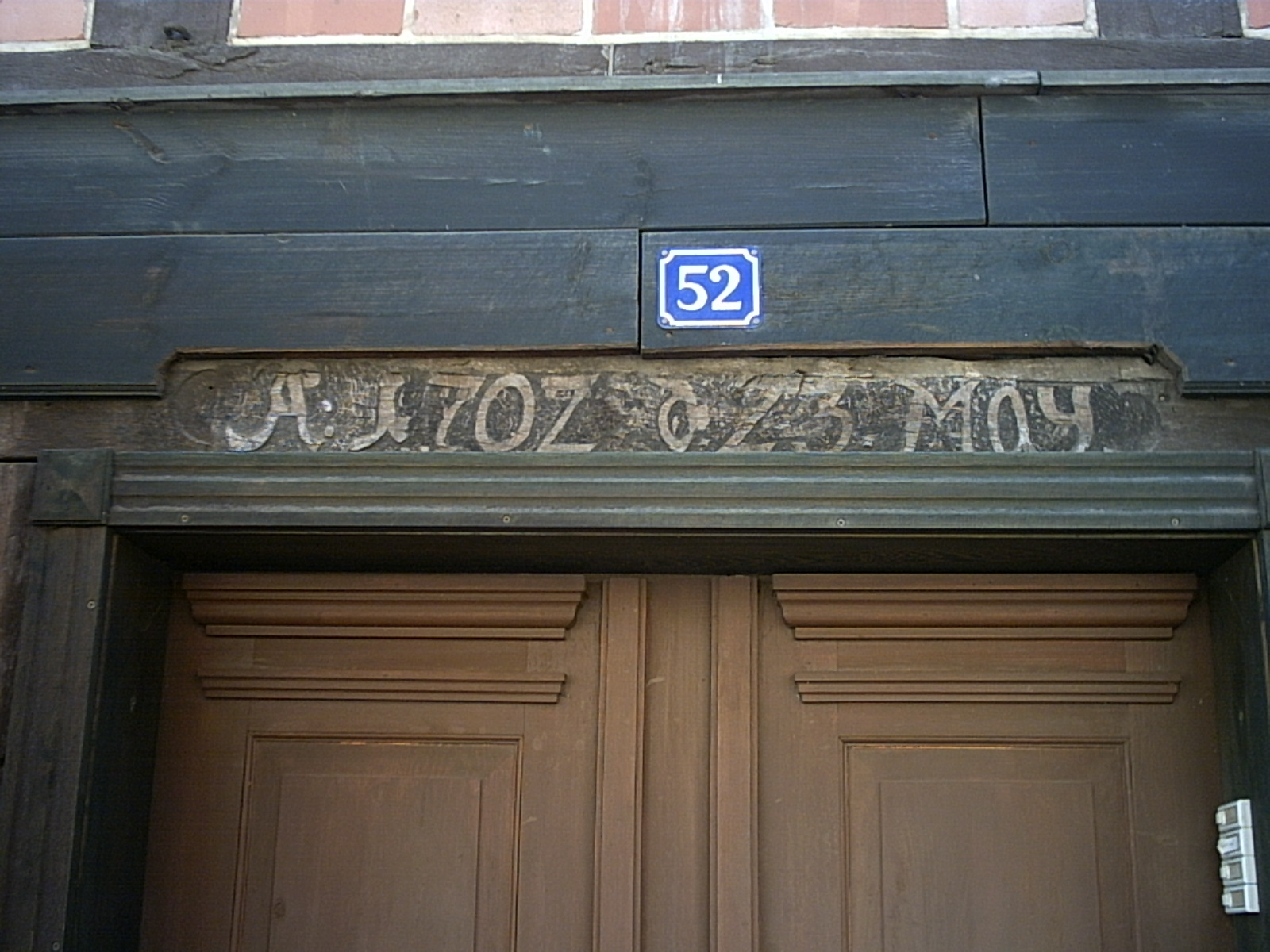
Date on the town's oldest building.

=== Modern period ===
The old town hall was built in 1687/88. On 3 June 1725, the vast majority of the town was destroyed by a great fire, this included the old town hall, which was rebuilt in 1728, remaining in use to this day; and the ducal palace, which was never rebuilt. After the fire, the incumbent first mayors, Hans Scheffer and Franz Heinrich Accidalius, commenced the rebuilding of the town in its now iconic style of close core timber-framed houses which still characterize the old town. The oldest building in Grabow dates to 23 May 1702, meaning that it survived the great fire.

As a result of the great fire, the Grabow Altarpiece, which was created in 1367 for the St. Petri church in Hamburg, was donated to the Grabow church 1726. It remained there until 1903 when it was bought by Alfred Lichtwark for the Hamburger Kunsthalle, returning it to Hamburg after its presence in Grabow for 177 years.

The first known Jews in Grabow showed up in records starting in 1749. They were two men: Moses Wulff and Siemon Moses, that earned their privilege of Schutzjude on 20 November 1753. By 1767, at least four Jews lived in Grabow and a small community of Jews had formed in the town by 1780 at the latest who maintained a small burial ground. A small synagogue may have also existed at the time, but was superseded by a new one, located at the intersection of Schulstraße and Wasserstraße, in 1798, which fell out of use before the 1930s, and was demolished in 1975. Grabow's Jewish population peaked in 1819 with 44 (8 families). Since the 18th century, Grabow has had a small Jewish cemetery, which the town maintains to this day.

In 1805, the painter Wilhelm Langschmidt was born in Grabow and later settled in the Elgin valley in South Africa. The town which grew around his trading store there still bears the name Grabouw, after his hometown.

On 1 July 1839, at the age of 28, Franz Floerke was elected mayor of Grabow with an absolute majority in the city council. His tenure, which at almost 50 years made him the longest-serving mayor in the town's history, was marked by prosperity and success. Arguably his biggest achievement was his advocacy for the construction of the Berlin–Hamburg railway through Grabow and the town's inclusion as a stop on the line; his endeavour successful, the first train arrived at the Grabow station from Berlin by noon on 15 October 1846 under applause of the residents. Floerke greatly contributed to the expansion of other infrastructure, such as bridges and roads; as well, while also promoting the settlement of industry in the town. His tenure ended upon his retirement on 1 January 1889, soon after which he died. He is commemorated by plaque on the town hall, a sculpture by Bernd Streiter, unveiled on 1 April 2016, and the road Floerkestraße which is named after him.

During 1843, Grabow had a population of 3,781, thereof 32 Jews and 259 cavalrymen.

=== World War II ===
The 1930 city council election was the last in Grabow before Nazi takeover had the following result: 8 Bürgerliche Liste, 5 SPD, 2 KPD. After the takeover, the city council was dissolved in November 1932 and reinstated in April 1933 with the following composition: 7 NSDAP, 5 SPD, 3 Kampffront Schwarz-Weiß-Rot. It was again dissolved in October 1935 and replaced by a council of 8 advisors to the mayor. The mayor at the time, Dr. Walter Bötcher, who had been in office since 1931, originally came from the DVP and only joined the NSDAP 1937. He was assisted by four 'temporary' vice-mayors and stayed in office until 1945.

After Hitler's rise to power, Jews faced increased discrimination which culminated in the Kristallnacht, although it is unknown if the already out-of-use synagogue, which was sold 1932, and the Jewish cemetery were affected during this time. Most Jews in Grabow were deported to concentration camps and murdered during the Holocaust. They are remembered by several Stolpersteine in the town, the first of which being laid in 2014. The last known Jew in Grabow was Betty Londe, née Rosenthal, who was recorded to be in a Mischehe (mixed marriage) in 1942, which ensured that she survived World War II, albeit her family facing discrimination.

Willi Fründt, a communist from Grabow, was deported to Neuengamme concentration camp and executed on 24 December 1944 as a result of Aktion Gitter.

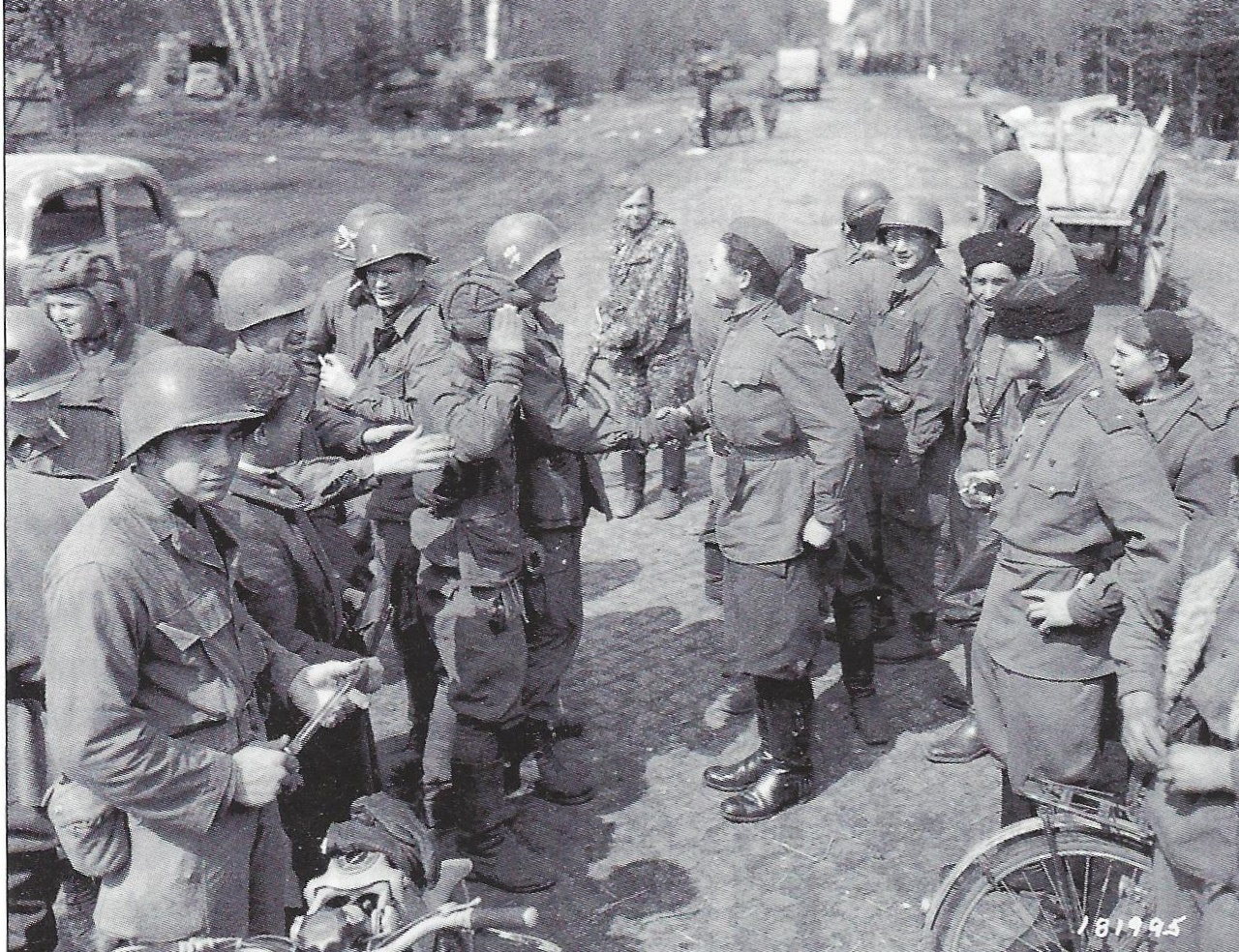
Meeting of Soviet and American soldiers in Grabow (3 May 1945)

In early 1945, German refugees arrived in Grabow and foreshadowed the coming arrival of Soviet troops to the town. The Reichsstatthalter of the Gau Mecklenburg, Friedrich Hildebrandt, had ordered to barricade the town and to blow up all bridges crossing the Elde, in order to establish the river as a defensive line. The Stadtkommandant of Grabow however, a beloved general, wanted to protect Grabow from destruction by surrendering it peacefully, but when another combat group arrived in April to prepare defenses of the town, four of the town's residents secretly defused the explosives that had already been applied to the bridges and eventually convinced the major to surrender the town without a fight. Soon after the combat group had left, on 3 May, the town started being looted by primarily escaped forced labours of Polish and Russian descent, although residents of the town also participated in this. One day prior, to prevent persecution, parts of the Heinsius family, which had been the single largest employer in the town at the time, fled into the Duchy of Lauenburg; Walther Heinsius however opted to stay in the town and, together with Hermann Krüger, approached the Americans in Ludwigslust with a white flag, surrendering the town without a fight. However, when the American troops of the Ninth Army entered Grabow to occupy it one day later, they encountered Soviet forces, the 2nd Belorussian Front, that had arrived earlier that same day. Seeing this, the Ninth Army again withdrew from the town and drew the temporary demarcation line between Grabow and Ludwigslust on 1 July 1945, leaving Grabow on the Soviet side. The Soviet occupation in Grabow was similar to that in other ares occupied by the Red Army, characterized by the rape of around 80 women and girls as well as a continuation of the looting, particularly of the remaining alcohol. Multiple residents of Grabow committed suicide during March, among them the poet and author Gustav Ritter. Most of the notable NSDAP-members in the town were interrogated, arrested, and eventually deported to the NKVD special camp Fünfeichen in Neubrandenburg; a similar fate befell Walther Heinsius who was arrested and released multiple times before finally also being deported to the camp where he would die of starvation on 16 July 1946. A small group of five former local Jungvolk-leaders staged a small resistance to the occupation by posting anti-Soviet graffitis on some houses at night, among them "Down with Stalin, long live Germany!", they too, would eventually be arrested and deported to the Fünfeichen camp, which only one of them survived. Since no fighting had taken place in the town, Grabow was nearly untouched by World War II.

During their occupation, the Soviets would install Luka P. Boldin as the town's Stadtkommandant. Boldin reorganized the town's municipal administration and installed Lithuanian-born Edgar Stafels as the town's mayor. Once it was revealed however, that Stafels had been a criminal who previously served time in a Zuchthaus, he was arrested by the police chief Karl Brandt, whose custody Stafels escaped three days later. The Stadtkommandant replaced Stafels with the moderate old-communist Friedrich Jacobs.

=== Under East Germany ===
On 1 July 1950, the former municipalities of Fresenbrügge (incl. Neu Fresenbrügge & Schleuse) and Wanzlitz (incl. Ausbau) were annexed into Grabow. The Amtsgericht Grabow, which was founded in 1879, was voided in 1945 and dissolved in 1950.

Goethestraße 8, a protected building, housed the GR-08 regiment in Grabow.

Starting on 1 March 1957, a regiment of the GDR Border Troops was stationed in Grabow at the address Goethestraße 8, the Grenzregiment 8, received the honorary name of Robert Abshagen on 1 March 1974. The building housing the regiment is now a protected residential unit.

Under the postal code system of East Germany, introduced on 1 January 1965, Grabow and some surrounding settlements were assigned the code 2804. Grabow's current postal code, 19300, was adopted on 1 June 1993 as a consequence of German reunification.

=== Since reunification ===
In 2005, the Amt Grabow-Land, which annexed the Amt Malliß in 2004, and the town of Grabow were merged into the administrative unit Amt Grabow, which persists to this day. The district of Ludwigslust, of which Grabow was a part, was merged with the district of Parchim on 4 September 2011, forming the new district of Ludwigslust-Parchim.

On 1 January 2016, Grabow annexed the former municipality Steesow, which became an exclave separated by 15 kilometres (9.3 mi) from the core municipal territory.

In 2024, Grabow participated in the Summer of Pioneers, a project attempting to help revive smaller towns.

Between 2 and 4 October 2026, Grabow hosted the 35th annual Mecklenburg-Vorpommern state harvest festival, Grabow last hosted the event in 1996.

== Demographics ==
As of the 2022 census, Grabow had a population of 5,436 (2023 estimate: 5,573), of which 2,781 (51.2%) are female and 2,655 (48.8%) are male. The median age in the municipality is 49.8, with 757 (13.9%) being under 18 and 1,653 (30.4%) being 65 or older.

Historical population

Year	Pop.	±%
1843	3,781	—
1875	4,207	+11.3%
1877	4,200	−0.2%
1880	4,470	+6.4%
1900	5,296	+18.5%
1910	5,636	+6.4%
1925	5,499	−2.4%
1933	5,860	+6.6%
1936	6,138	+4.7%
1937	6,170	+0.5%
1939	6,081	−1.4%

Year	Pop.	±%
1942	6,385	+5.0%
1947	8,838	+38.4%
1946	8,950	+1.3%
1970	8,500	−5.0%
1980	8,700	+2.4%
1984	8,600	−1.1%
1989	8,200	−4.7%
1990	8,098	−1.2%
1995	7,240	−10.6%
1997	6,934	−4.2%
2000	6,741	−2.8%

Year	Pop.	±%
2005	6,231	−7.6%
2009	5,846	−6.2%
2010	5,859	+0.2%
2011	5,807	−0.9%
2015	5,556	−4.3%
2020	5,559	+0.1%
2021	5,500	−1.1%
2022	5,436	−1.2%
2023	5,573	+2.5%
2024	5,422	−2.7%

Data may be affected by territorial fluctuation.
Sources: 1843, 1880 1910,1925, 1875/1900/1933-1947/2009, 1877/1946/1970/1980/1989, 1990-2020, 2011, 2022, 2023, 2024

In 1947 the population consisted of 5,323 residents and 3,515 expellees, thus explaining the population jump to 8,838.

=== Citizenship ===
As of the 2022 census, 5,257 (96.7%) of the population have German citizenship and 176 (3.2%) do not. Broken down, the residents in Grabow by citizenship are as follows:

Citizenship	2022		2011 (Note: Non-German citizen were grouped together as "foreigners" in the 2011 census source.)	
Citizenship	Nr.	%	Nr.	%
Germany	5,257	96.7	5,761	99.2
Ukraine	41	0.8	44	0.8
Poland	34	0.6	44	0.8
Syria	20	0.4	44	0.8
Croatia	14	0.3	44	0.8
Serbia	7	0.1	44	0.8
Bosnia	5	0.1	44	0.8
Bulgaria	5	0.1	44	0.8
Turkey	5	0.1	44	0.8
Afghanistan	5	0.1	44	0.8

=== Religion ===
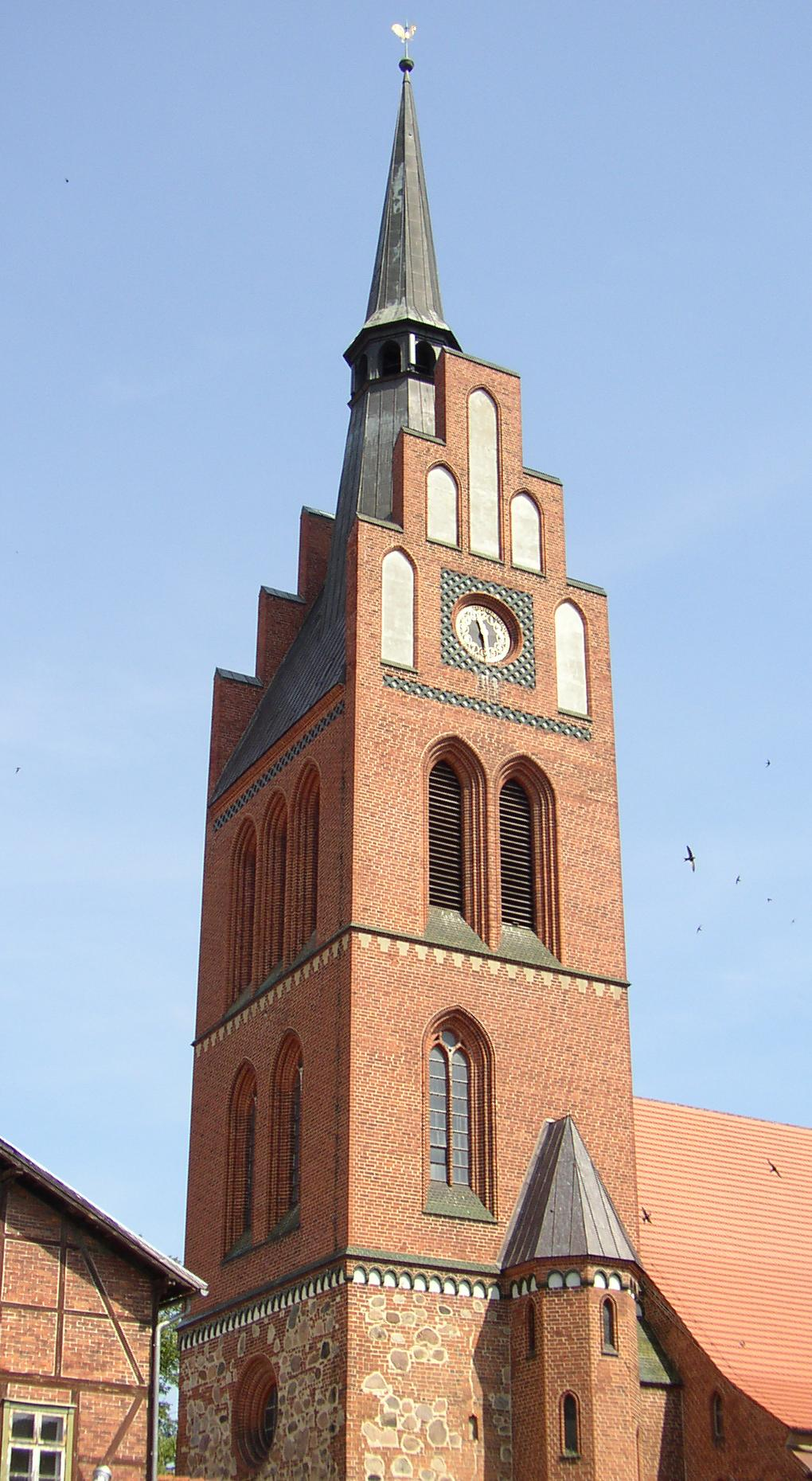
St. Georgs church

As of the 2022 census, most of the population in Grabow does not belong to either of the two state-recognized churches.

Confession or Church	2022		2011	
Confession or Church	Nr.	%	Nr.	%
Evangelical Church in Germany	885	16.3	1,153	19.9
Catholic Church in Germany	125	2.3	130	2.2
Other or irreligious	4,427	81.4	4,522	77.9

The town church is the evangelical-lutheran St. Georgs church which lies in the centre of the old town, just behind the town hall. It is the highest building in the town and was built in 1781 with the pulpit dating back to 1555, making it the second oldest pulpit in all of Germany. A church in Grabow was first mentioned in the year 1285. Two other churches lie within the town's core: the catholic Maria Magdalena church located in an old horse stable since 1958, and a small Seventh-day Adventist Church. Grabow, which has no known Jewish population today, used to have a synagogue until 1932 and continues to maintain the old Jewish cemetery.

The hinterland village of Bochin has its own, unnamed, evangelical-lutheran church built in 1894.

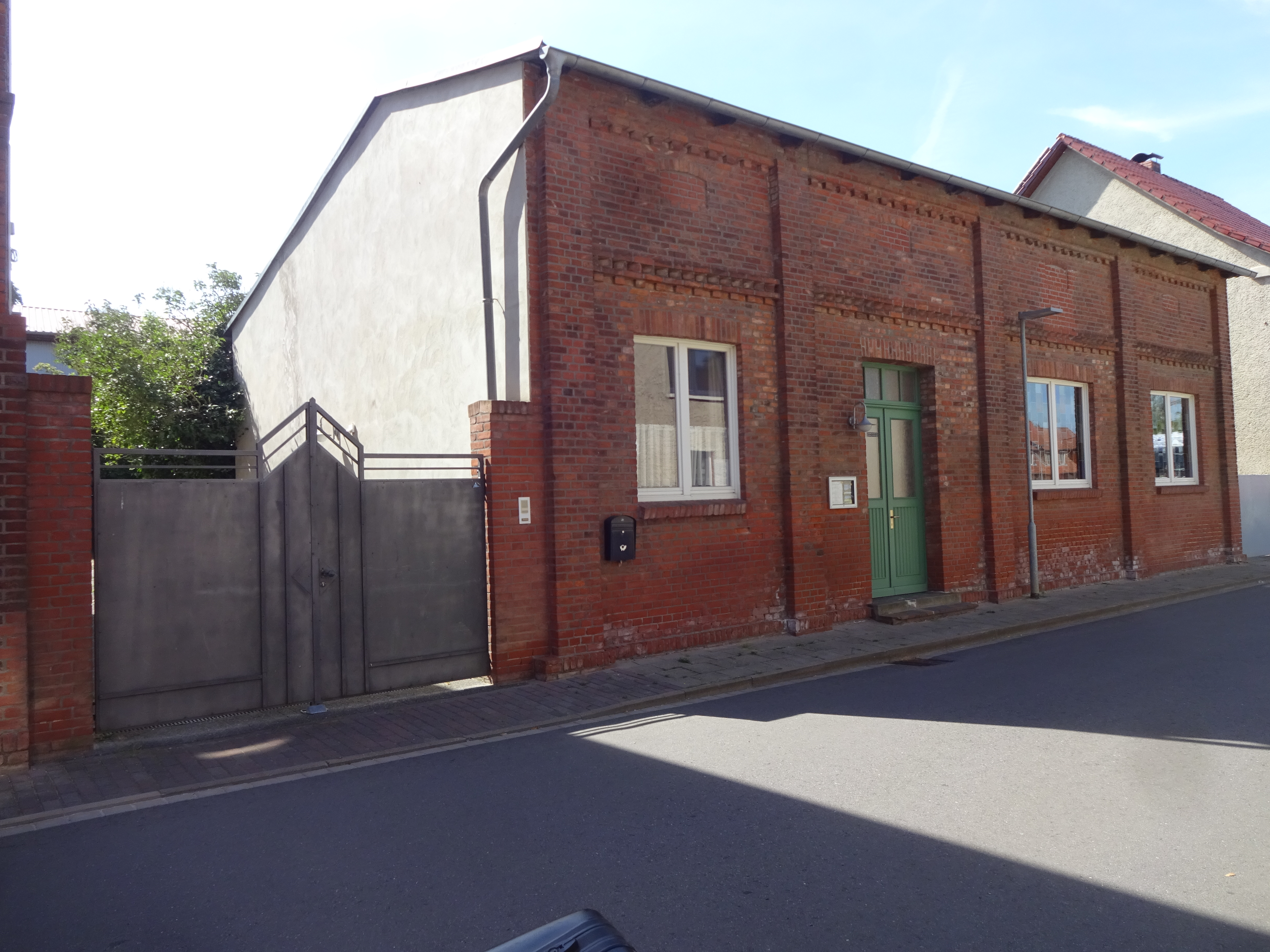
Catholic Maria Magdalena church

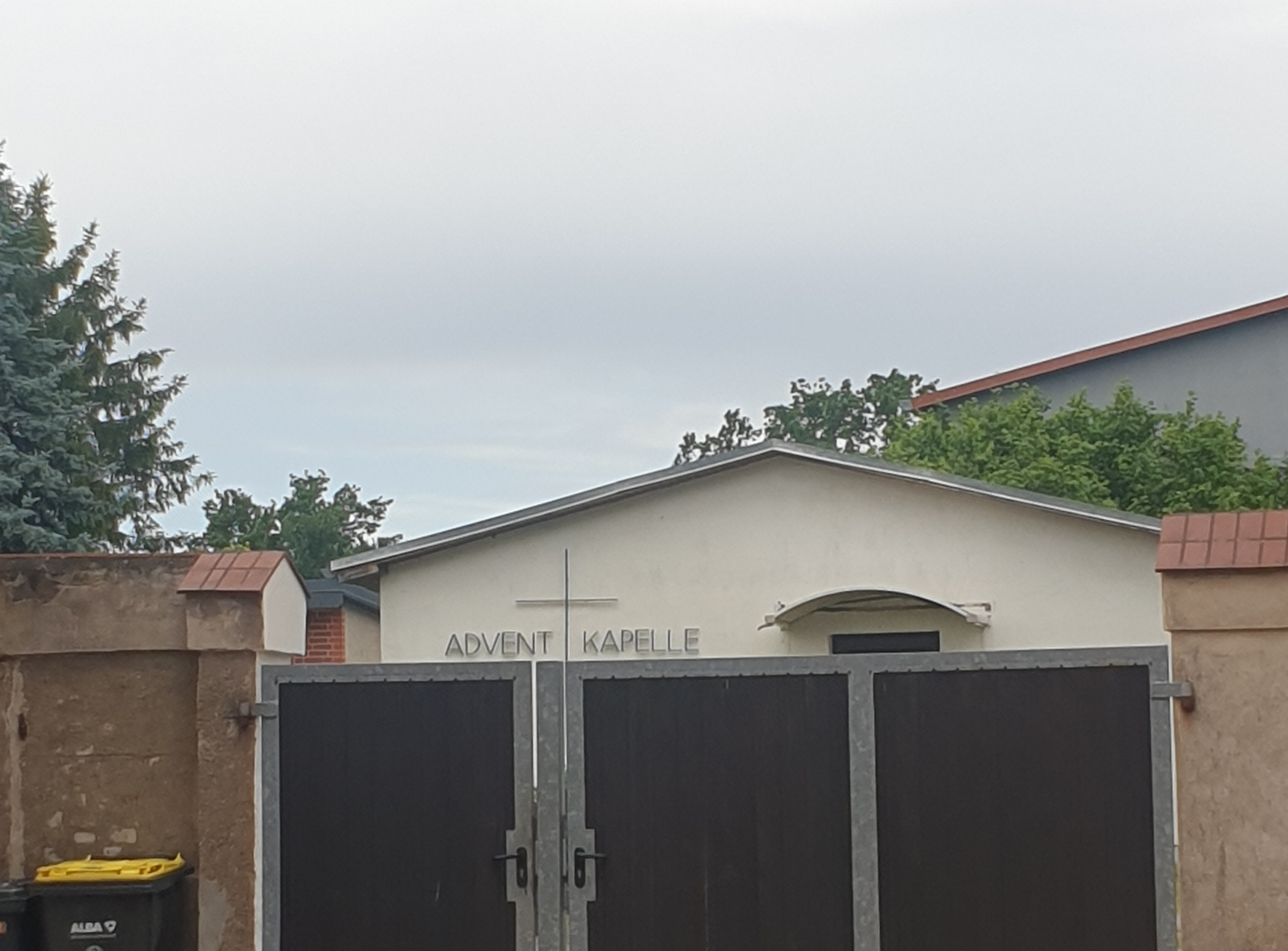
Seventh-day Adventist Church in Grabow

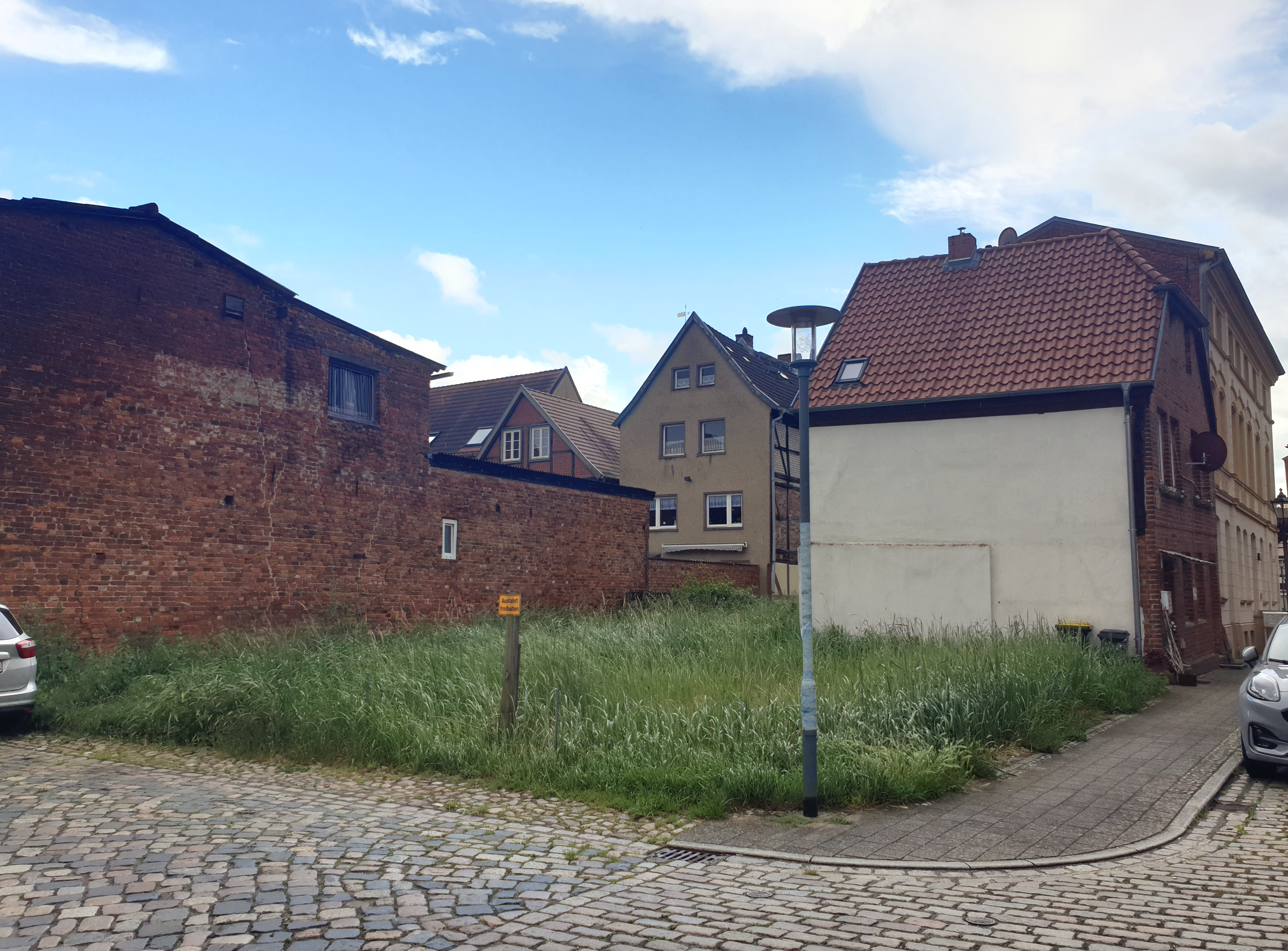
Location of the former synagogue in Grabow

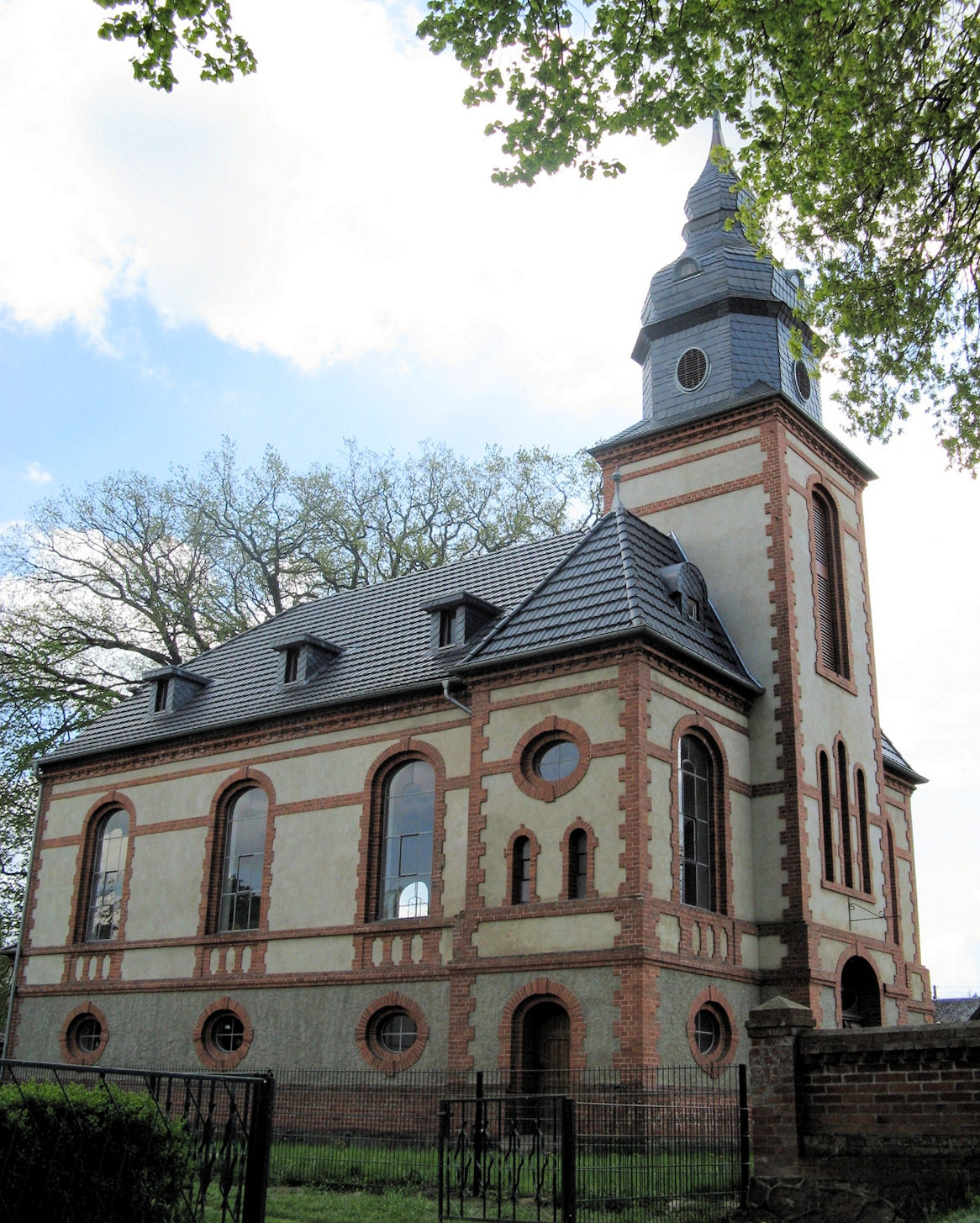
Protestant church in the village of Bochin

== Politics ==
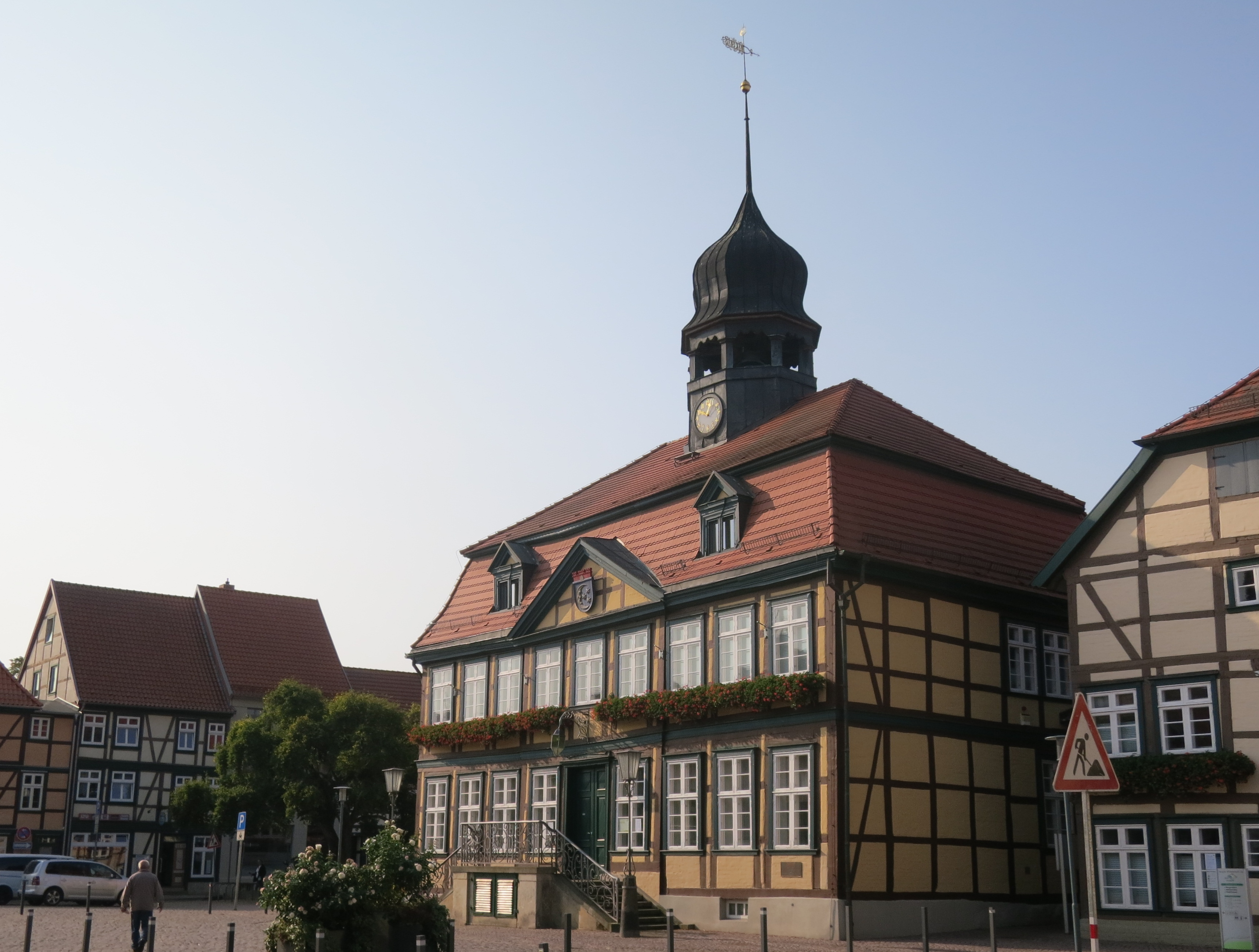
Grabow town hall

Due to being the seat of the Amt Grabow, the town's administration extends some of its jurisdiction over the other member municipalities.

The municipal council as well as the Amt and city administration are located in the town hall at Am Marktplatz 1.

=== City council ===
Total 17 seats
- SPD: 4
- Strong Grabow: 4
- FW: 2
- CDU: 4
- AfD: 3

As of the last election, Grabow's city council consist of 17 members. The most recent elections were the 2024 Mecklenburg-Vorpommern municipal elections, held on 9 June 2024, with the following result:

Party	Votes	Share		Seats	
Party	Votes	%	+/-	Won	+/–
Christian Democratic Union of Germany (CDU)	2,184	25.20	▲0.56	4	0
Strong Grabow	2,026	23.38	▲4.87	4	▲1
Social Democratic Party of Germany (SPD)	1,942	22.41	▼12.61	4	▼2
Alternative for Germany (AfD)	1,711	19.74	New	3	▲3
Free Voters	804	9.28	New	2	▲2
Total	8,667	100.0		17	0
Valid votes	8,667	95.76			
Invalid/blank votes	192	2.12			
Total votes	8,859	100.0			
Turnout	3,017	63.57	▲8.15		
Eligible voters	4,746				

Previous elections had the following results:

Year Party	2024		2019		2014		2009		2004		1999		1994	
Year Party	%	Seats	%	Seats	%	Seats	%	Seats	%	Seats	%	Seats	%	Seats
CDU	25.20	4	24.64	4	15.4	3	34.0	6	45.7	9	45.7	9	28.3	6
Strong Grabow (Note: 2014 as ABG)	23.38	4	18.51	3	12.8	2	did not exist		did not exist		did not exist		did not exist	
SPD	22.41	4	35.02	6	30.7	5	31.2	6	29.5	6	29.5	6	39.4	9
AfD	19.74	3	did not run		did not run		did not exist		did not exist		did not exist		did not exist	
FW	9.28	2	did not run		did not run		did not run		did not run		did not run		did not run	
AfG	did not run		12.0	2	10,9	2	did not exist		did not exist		did not exist		did not exist	
The Left (Note: until 2007 as PDS)	did not run		9.83	2	17.5	3	19.1	4	18.6	3	18.7	3	25.9	6
FDP	did not run		did not run		12.7	2	15.7	3	did not run		0.9	0	2.6	0 (Note: Mecklenburg-Vorpommern enforced a 5%-threshold for municipal elections until 2004)
Greens	did not run		did not run		did not run		did not run		did not run		did not run		3.9	0
Independents	did not run		did not run		did not run		did not run		5.2	1 (Note: Hartmut Linow)	5.2	1 (Note: Norbert Alff)	did not run	

Strong Grabow (German: Starkes Grabow) and Alternative for Grabow (German: Alternative für Grabow, AfG) are voter groups.

=== Mayor ===
Results of the mayoral election in 2025 by polling district/station

The current mayor is Kathleen Bartels (SPD) who was elected on 21 October 2018 with 54.82% of the vote for a term of seven years. She was reelected on 11 May 2025, winning 52% of the vote. Despite her having four opponents in the 2025 election, she won reelection in the first round, one of the few people elected in the first round that day. The other candidates were Markus Rohst (CDU) with 20.98%, Thomas Binder (AfD) with 18.74%, and Karl Kessner (FW) with 8.36% of the vote.

Candidate	Party	Votes	Share	
Candidate	Party	Votes	%	+/-
Kathleen Bartels	SPD (Note: Supported by Strong Grabow.)	1,527	51.92	▼2.90
Markus Rohst	CDU	617	20.98	▼15.27
Thomas Binder	AfD	551	18.74	New
Karl Kessner	FW	246	8.36	New
Total		2,941	100.0	
Valid votes		2,941	99.53	
Invalid/blank votes		14	0.47	
Total votes		2,955	100.0	
Turnout		2,955	62.73	▲5.18
Eligible voters		4,711		

List of mayors

The following is a list of Grabow's mayors since 1787. Until 1766, Grabow had two mayors serving concurrently.

- 1787–1822: Georg-Andreas-Adam Wennmohs
- 1822–1839: Martin-Conrad Stollberg
- 1839–1888: Franz Floerke
- 1888–1912: Carl Calsow
- 1912–1918: Paul Becker
- 1919–1930: Werner Siegismund
- 1931–1945: Walter Bötcher (DVP, 1937: NSDAP)
- 1945: Edgar Stafels
- 1945: Friedrich Jacobs (KPD)
- 1948–1949: Heinz Böhme
- 1949–1950: Meta Malinowski
- 1950–1951: Otto Brockmann
- 1951–1953: Fritz Flint (CDU)
- 1953–1954: Richard Fischer
- 1954–1960: Karl-Heinz Tralau (CDU)
- 1960–1976: Hans Hummel
- 1976–1989: Harold Cassun
- 1989–1990: Wolfgang Neureuter
- 1990: Dagobert Balfanz (CDU)
- 1991–1992: Martin Beunink
- 1993–1994: Brigitte Dörfler (SPD; acting)
- 1994–2013: Ulrich Schult (SPD)
- 2013–2018: Stefan Sternberg (SPD)
- since 2018: Kathleen Bartels (SPD)

=== National and regional election results ===
==== Mecklenburg-Vorpommern state election ====
Results of the 2026 state election in Grabow by polling district/station

The Alternative for Germany (AfD) won first place in Grabow during the 2026 state election in Mecklenburg-Vorpommern with 42% of the vote, followed by the Social Democratic Party (SPD) which won 38% of the vote share in the municipality. Grabow, for the purpose of elections, is subdivided into polling districts which correspond to polling stations, the district & station with the best AfD result was Grabow II, primarily consisting of the old town, where the party won 50.2% of the local vote share. The best SPD result meanwhile, was won in the postal voting district with 53.6%.

Party	Party list		Constituency	
Party	Votes	%	Votes	%
AfD	1,467	42.01	1,561	44.90
SPD	1,327	38.00	1,233	35.46
BSW	186	5.33		
The Left	141	4.04	239	6.87
CDU	121	3.47	147	4.23
FW	70	2.00	210	6.04
Greens	75	2.15	51	1.47
Tierschutzpartei	37	1.06		
FDP	25	0.72	36	1.04
Handwerkerpartei	15	0.43		
Die PARTEI	11	0.32		
TF	6	0.17		
Piraten	4	0.11		
ÖDP	2	0.06		
KPD	2	0.06		
WLD	1	0.03		
PdF	1	0.03		
Bündnis C	1	0.03		
Volt	0	0.00		
Total	3,492	100.00	3,477	100.00
Valid votes	3,492	99.12	3,477	98.69
Invalid/blank votes	31	0.88	46	1.31
Total votes	3,523	100.00	3,523	100.00
Registered voters/turnout	4,576	76.99	4,576	76.99
Source: State Returning Officer

=== Coat of arms ===
The town's first identifying symbol was a city seal from the 1371 which depicted the local patron saint, St. George, standing above a lying crowned male while holding a shield, charged with a fitchy cross, and sword. From 1667 onwards, the seal depicted a big star above a crescent recumbent. The town was first granted a coat of arms, resembling the current pattern and based on the previous seal design, on 10 April 1858 by Grand Duke Franz II of Mecklenburg-Schwerin. Since this initial adoption in 1858 the design of the coat of arms only changed marginally with the exception of a six-year period from 1940 to 1946, under Nazi Germany, where the coat of arms was replaced with a version based on the first recorded city seal, depicting St. George in clad armour, fighting a dragon with a lance to which a pennant, charged with a golden swastika, was attached. In 1946 this change was reverted, changing the city's arms back to a crescent with three stars, this time however replacing the golden colour of the crescent and stars with silver. In 1991 the colour of the crescent and stars was again changed to changed to gold.

The modern version of the town's coat of arms was officially granted on 20 June 1991 by the Minister of the Interior of Mecklenburg-Vorpommern. Only marginally different than previous iterations, it now included a mural crown.

Blazon: "Shield Azure, a waning crescent Or accompanied at sinister by three 6-point stars of the same in triangle. The shield is crested by a mural crown Gules with three visible towers and port Or."

=== Flag ===
Flag of Grabow

The flag of Grabow is a blue-yellow-blue triband with a stripe ratio of 1:2:1. The flag's central yellow band is charged with the city's coat of arms. The ratio of the flag is 5:3. It was designed by Heinz Kippnick from Schwerin and it was approved by the Minister of the Interior of Mecklenburg-Vorpommern on 17 March 1999.

== Culture ==
The motto of Grabow is "colorful city on the Elde" (German: Bunte Stadt an der Elde) due to its colorful timber-framed architecture.

=== Sights ===
==== Fritz-Reuter-Haus ====
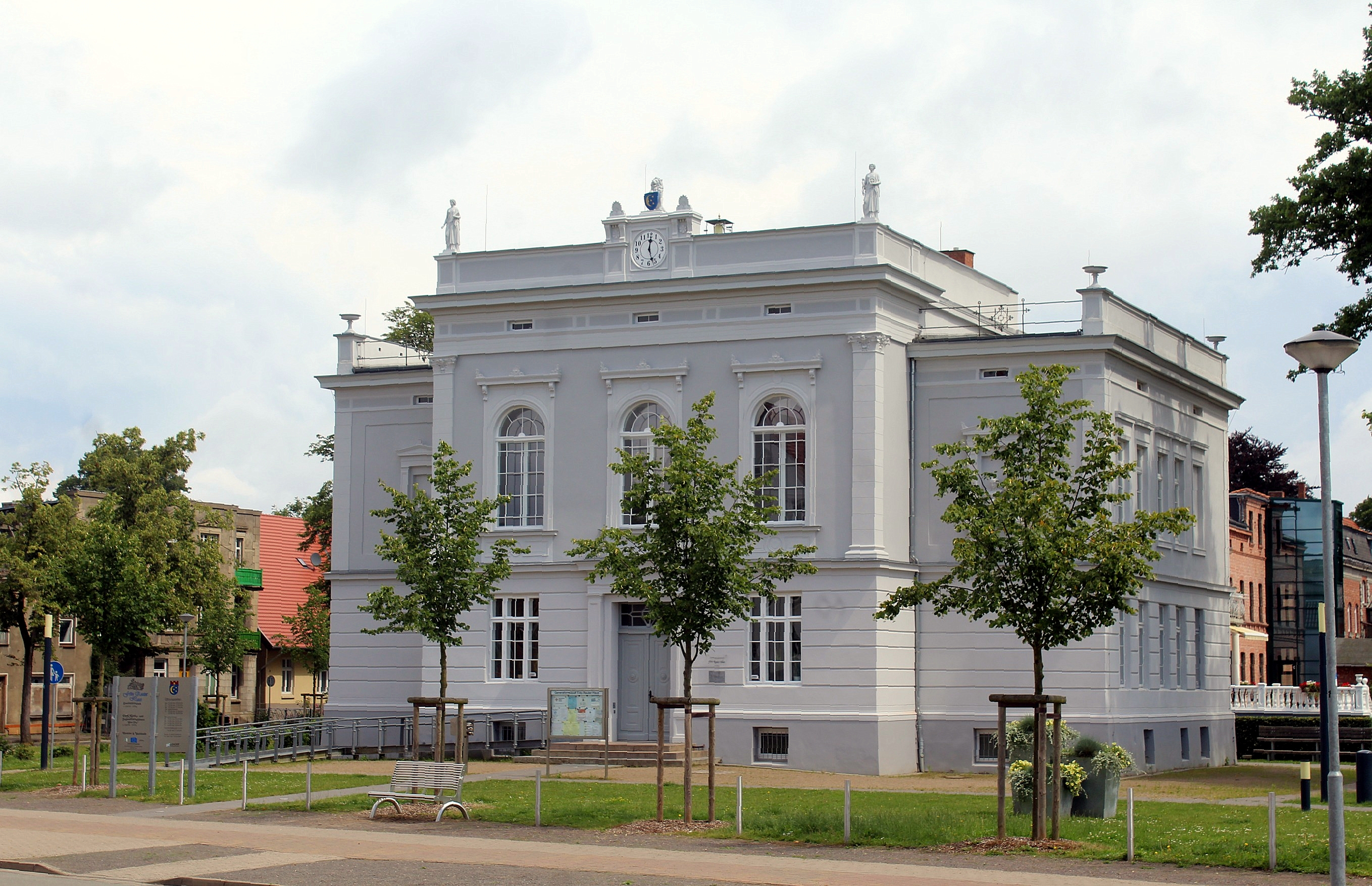
Fritz-Reuter-Haus

The Fritz-Reuter-Haus, also known as just Reuterhaus, is located at Kießerdamm 19a and serves as the town's community centre, labeled "Generationenhaus". The building is home to the youth centre "Blue Sun" and, until its closure in 2023, the city library.

The building was constructed between 1868 and 1870 and became the home of the Fritz-Reuter-Schule on 7 September 1870 by grant of the mayor Franz Floerke. Initially functioning as a realprogymnasium, the school was transformed into a real school (realschule) starting in 1919 and underwent according renovations until 1924. During East German times, the school became a Polytechnic Secondary School (POS) and was painted in yellow, giving it the nickname "yellow school" (Gelbe Schule). After reunification it again began operating as a real school until its closure in 1990. It was reopened in its current form as the town's community centre in 2008.

==== Bolbrüggesche Mühle ====
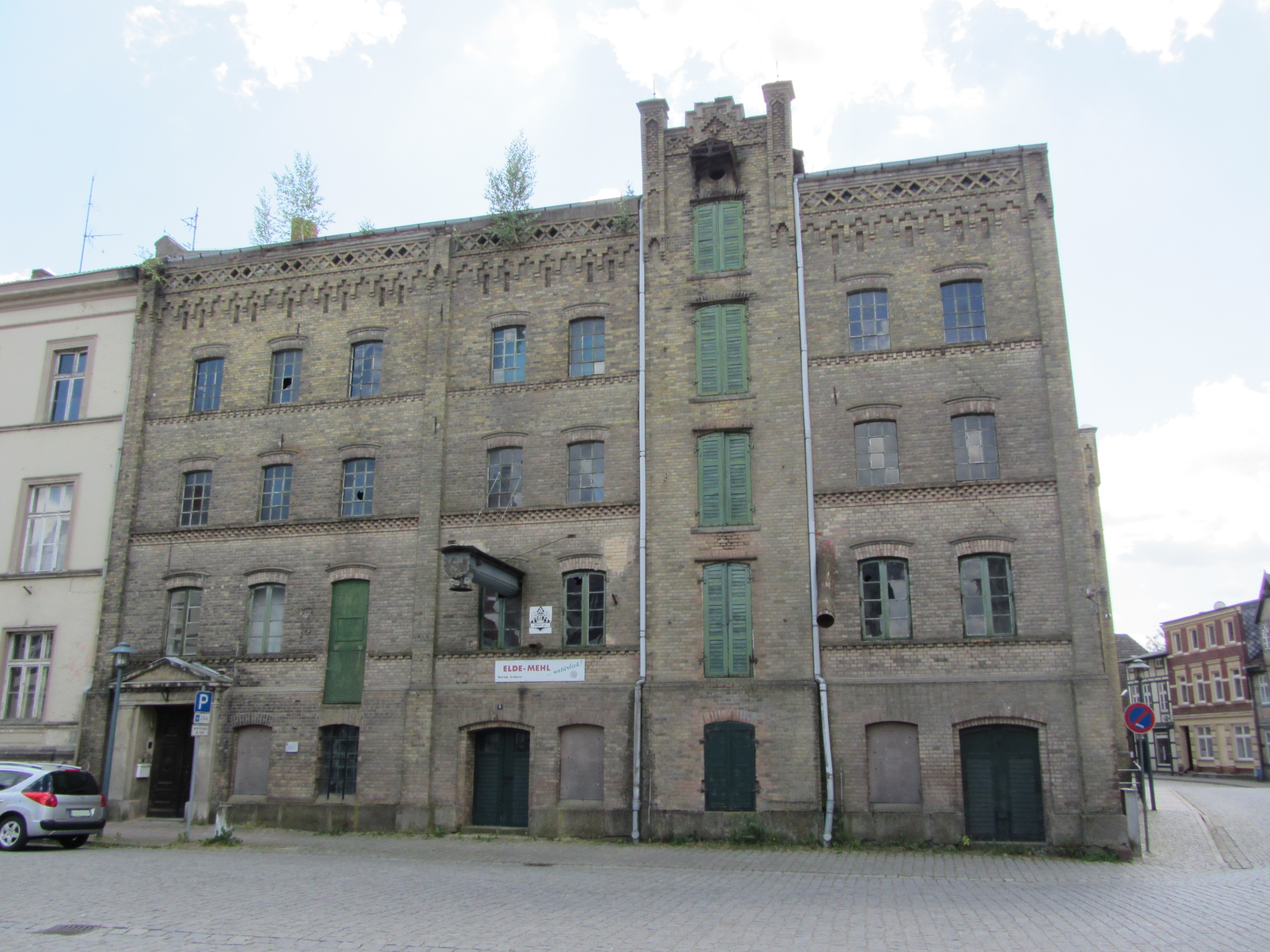
As viewed from the front entrance (Pferdemarkt), 2014

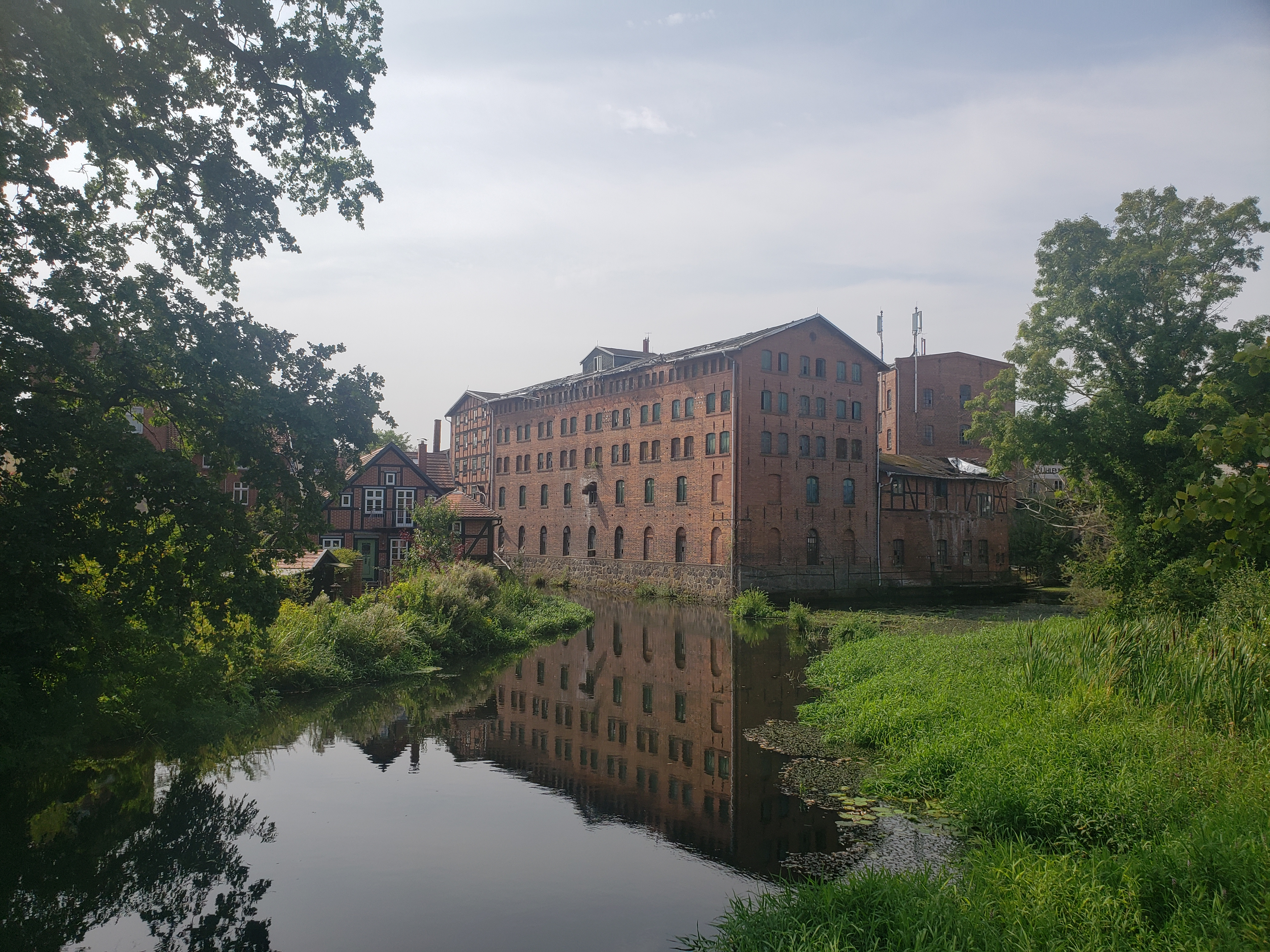
As viewed from the back (Willi-Fründt-Brücke), 2024

A watermill for cereals was first mentioned in Grabow during the 14th century and initially operated as a service where residentes could take their cereals to have them milled for a price, this mode was gradually replaced with a business-mill that directly bought produce from farmers and sold the flour to producers.

Despite likely already being the millers for a long time, the Bolbrügge family was first mentioned as the mill's owners in 1917 when they celebrated the company's 200 year anniversary and sponsored the construction of a hospital in remembrance of the fallen workers in the ongoing World War I. Carl Bolbrügge, the mill's most notable owner, ascended to the position of miller in the 1890s after completing his university education in engineering. Under his leadership, the mill was significantly modernized and expanded, even starting to generate electricity by 1923. It is said that the millers Bolbrügge were the most wealthy family in Mecklenburg around 1880. In 1951, under East Germany, the miller's family was expropriated and the mill collectivized. It continued to operate until 1998 when the mill building was abandoned and left to rot. The production of hydroelectricity next to the mill continues to this day however.

==== Town hall ====
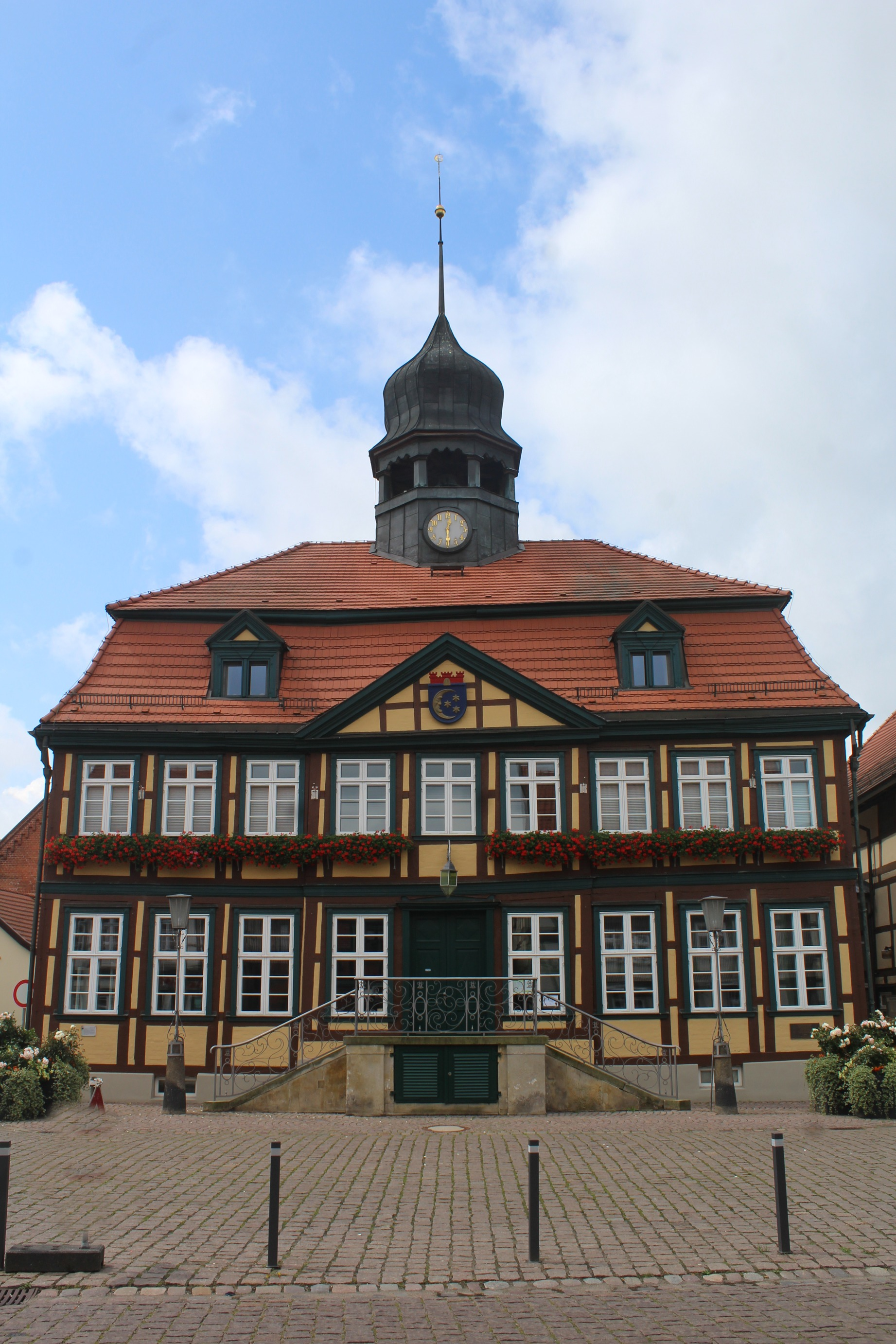
Town hall as viewed from the marketplace, 2017

The Grabow town hall is considered to be the most important building in the town and one of the most notable town halls in all of Mecklenburg from an historical and architectural perspective. It is also a listed building and thus subject to special protections.

Construction of the current town hall started in 1726, only one year after the great fire in 1725, and by 1727, construction of the building finished. Its current paint was applied in 1922. On 9 February 1963 a small fire started in the town hall due to an issue with the chimney, this fire could however be quickly extinguished and did not cause notable damage to the building. Notable renovations were undertaken in 1975 as part of the city's 725 year birthday and after reunification starting in 1995. During New Year's Eve 2022/23, the town hall was damaged by firecrackers despite their prohibition in the old town, it was soon after repaired.

For about 150 years after its construction, the town hall served not just as an administrative building but also as a restaurant. It was initially thought that this restaurant was located in the town hall's basement, as is usual for a German Ratskeller; while this was untrue as all of its gastronomic services took place on the ground floor, this misconception inspired the name of the Ratskeller Grabow restaurant which, founded after the town hall itself hosted a restaurant, was located directly opposite of the town hall on the town's marketplace. Although the original Ratskeller Grabow restaurant was demolished during GDR-times, a restaurant of the same name was re-opened at the same location after German reunification.

While the town hall does not include any special artworks within its walls, it is notable for the famous figures that have visited it, including but not limited to Fritz Reuter, former school friend of the mayor at the time Franz Floerke who visited in 1839, and Frederick Francis IV, Grand Duke of Mecklenburg-Schwerin, who visited it in 1905; the former's visit is commemorated by a plaque on the building.

==== Church ====
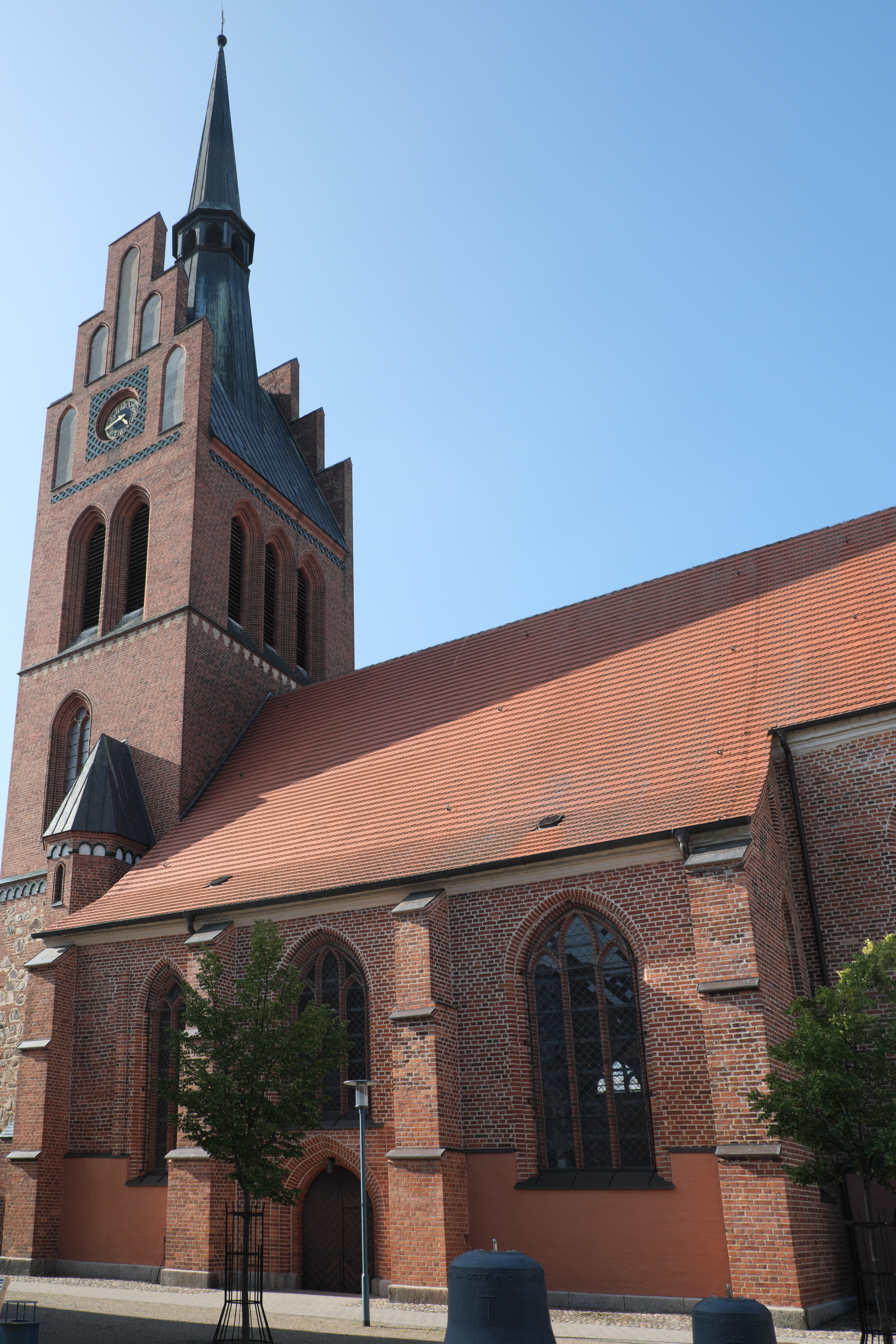
St. Georgs church, 2023 view from Kirchenstraße (south-west)

Although a church in Grabow was first mentioned in the year 1285, this church was destroyed during the great fire in 1725 while holding a service. The following Sunday, a service commemorating the loss of the church was held in its ruins and three Grabow residents, the organist Emanuel Ludolf Sellschop, the artist Christoph Meier, and the shoemaker Joachim Eberhard; were tasked with collecting donations for the reconstruction of the church. Together they traveled through northern Germany where they were allowed to collect offerings at churches in the Duchies of Schleswig and Holstein as well as in Copenhagen. Their journey came to ahead with two donations from the Hanseatic cities of Lübeck and Hamburg, the former's St. Peter's church donated a Renaissance-style pulpit constructed in 1555 while the latter's St. Peter's church donated the late 1367 artwork of Bertram von Minden, that would later become known as the Grabow Altarpiece, in 1726. The Hamburger resident Johann Helweg Gerdes, who had brought his church to donate the altarpiece, also paid for its repairs. Both artworks are still in tact, while the Grabow Altarpiece was returned to Hamburg when it was bought by Alfred Lichtwark for the Hamburger Kunsthalle on 12 November 1903, returning it to Hamburg after its presence in Grabow for 177 years, the pulpit from Lübeck remains in Grabow and is the town's oldest artwork as well as the second oldest pulpit in all of Germany. After its return, the Grabow Altarpiece was replaced with the 1909 work of Fritz Greve which remains in the church today. The money attained from the altarpiece's sale, a price well below its worth due to the towns' ignorance, was used to reconstruct the church tower that was to replace the small stub that had acted as the church's tower since after the fire.

Grabow's current church largely finished construction in 1733 after further donations were collected in Mecklenburg and the death of a construction worker, Joachim Berg from Bresegrad. The Grabow Altarpiece was installed on 12 February 1734, with the pulpit being set up in the church later that year. The first organ was installed in 1741 but was later replaced with an 1811 organ by Friedrich Friese III from Parchim that was itself replaced in 1855 with the last major work of the same person, this 1855 organ is still in use today.

The modern town church is named St. Georgs and is of evangelical-lutheran confession. It is the highest building in the town.

==== Museum ====
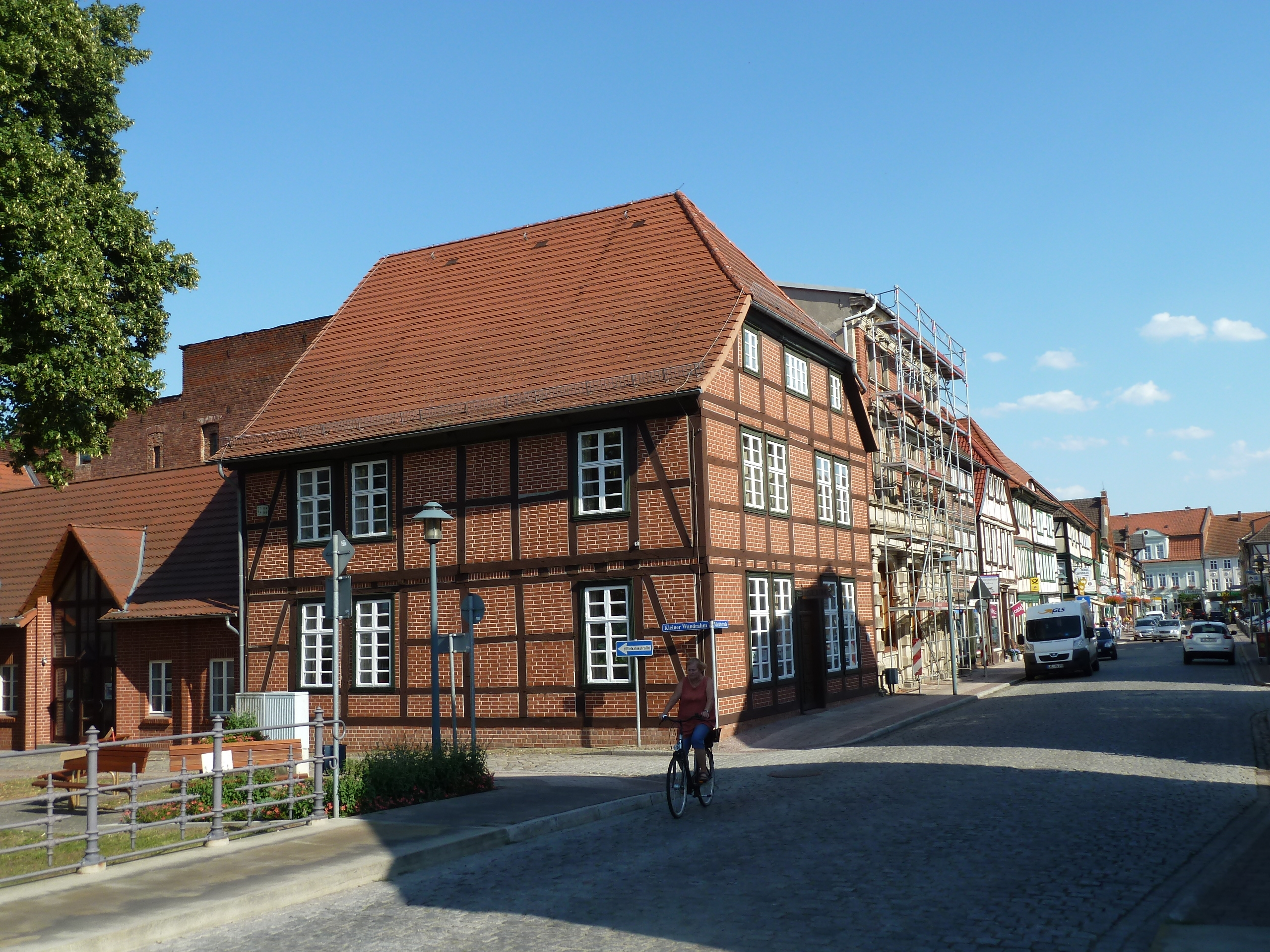
Former factory building, now museum

The town museum is located at Marktstraße 19, in the same building that served as the Grabower Süsswaren factory from foundation until as late as GDR-times.

=== Cuisine ===
Grabow well known for its "Grabower Küßchen" chocolate-coated marshmallow treats. They are produced by the Grabower Süsswaren GmbH which was originally founded by Johann Bollhagen in 1835 as the Bollhagenschen Pfeffernuß- und Bisquitfabrik that primarily produced pretzels, waffles, and Pfeffernüsse. After World War II, it was transformed into the VEB Grabower Dauerbackwaren under East German rule and started producing the now-iconic treat. The company was re-privatized in 1991 and has been owned by the Dutch Continental Bakeries since 2010, which itself was acquired by Biscuit International in 2022.

=== Festivals ===
Since 30 March 2007, Grabow held an annual light festival where some of the town's buildings are lit up with colorful lights and music is played. It has been described as a mix of a Volksfest and light show. Other regular festivals include the Stadtfest (city festival) and the Martinimarkt, the latter of which taking place annually on the second weekend (Friday and Saturday) of November since 1577.

=== Media and art ===
A pro-AfD online newspaper, run by AfD city councilor Thomas Binder, named Stadtkieker Grabow is located in the town.

The German punk-rock band Debil partially originates from Grabow.

== Gallery ==
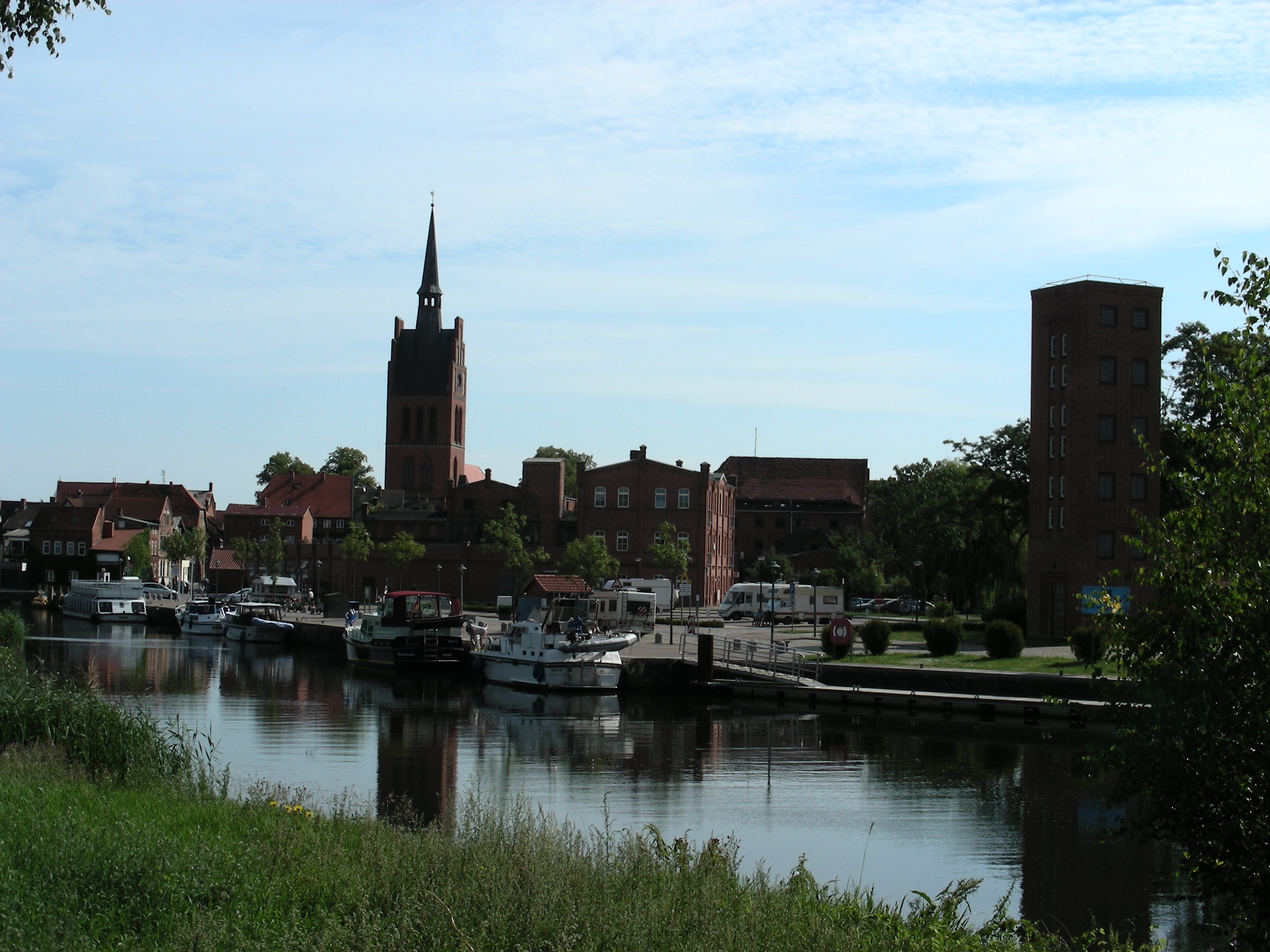
Grabow from the other side of the Elde

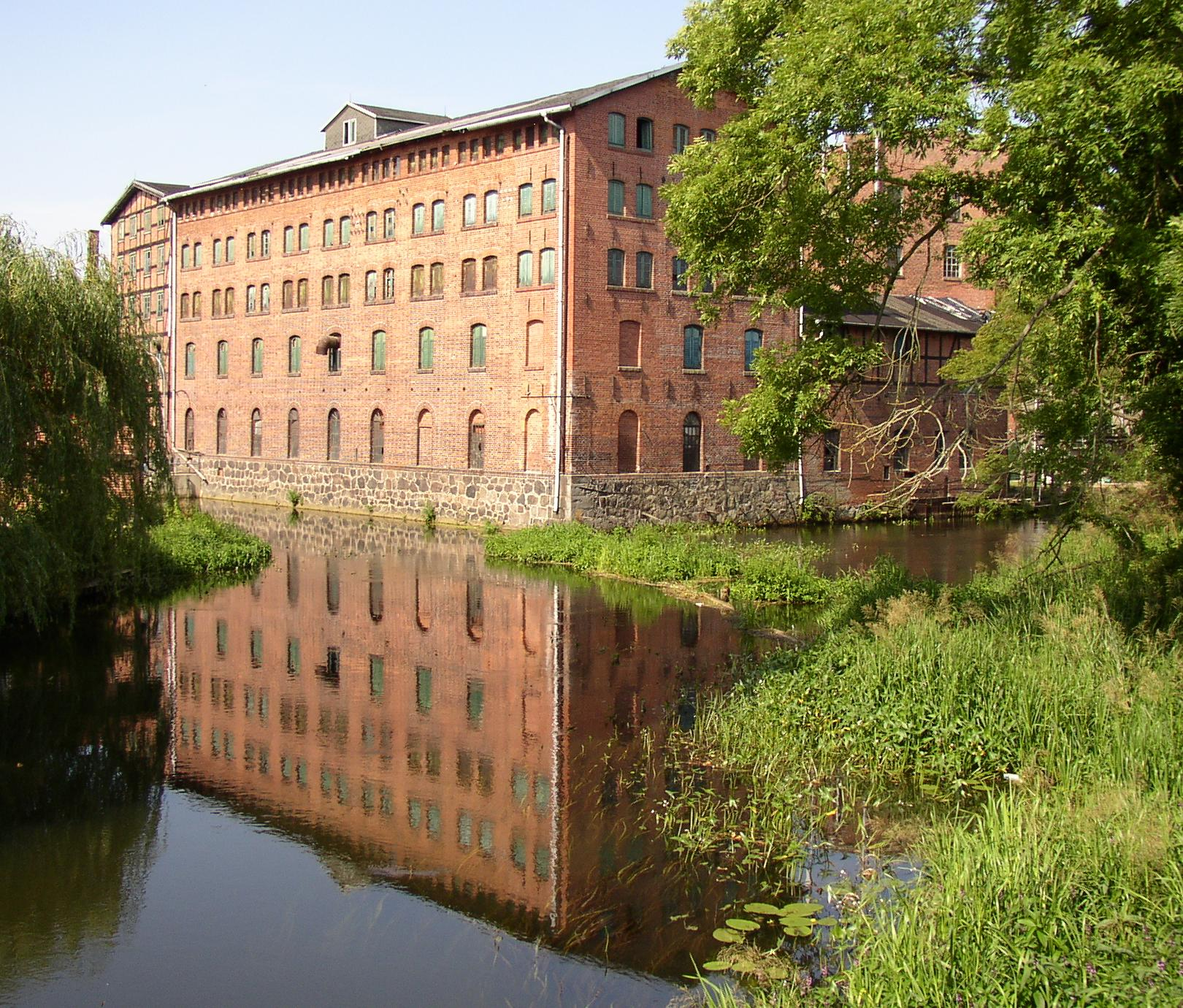
Bolbrüggesche Mühle viewed from the water

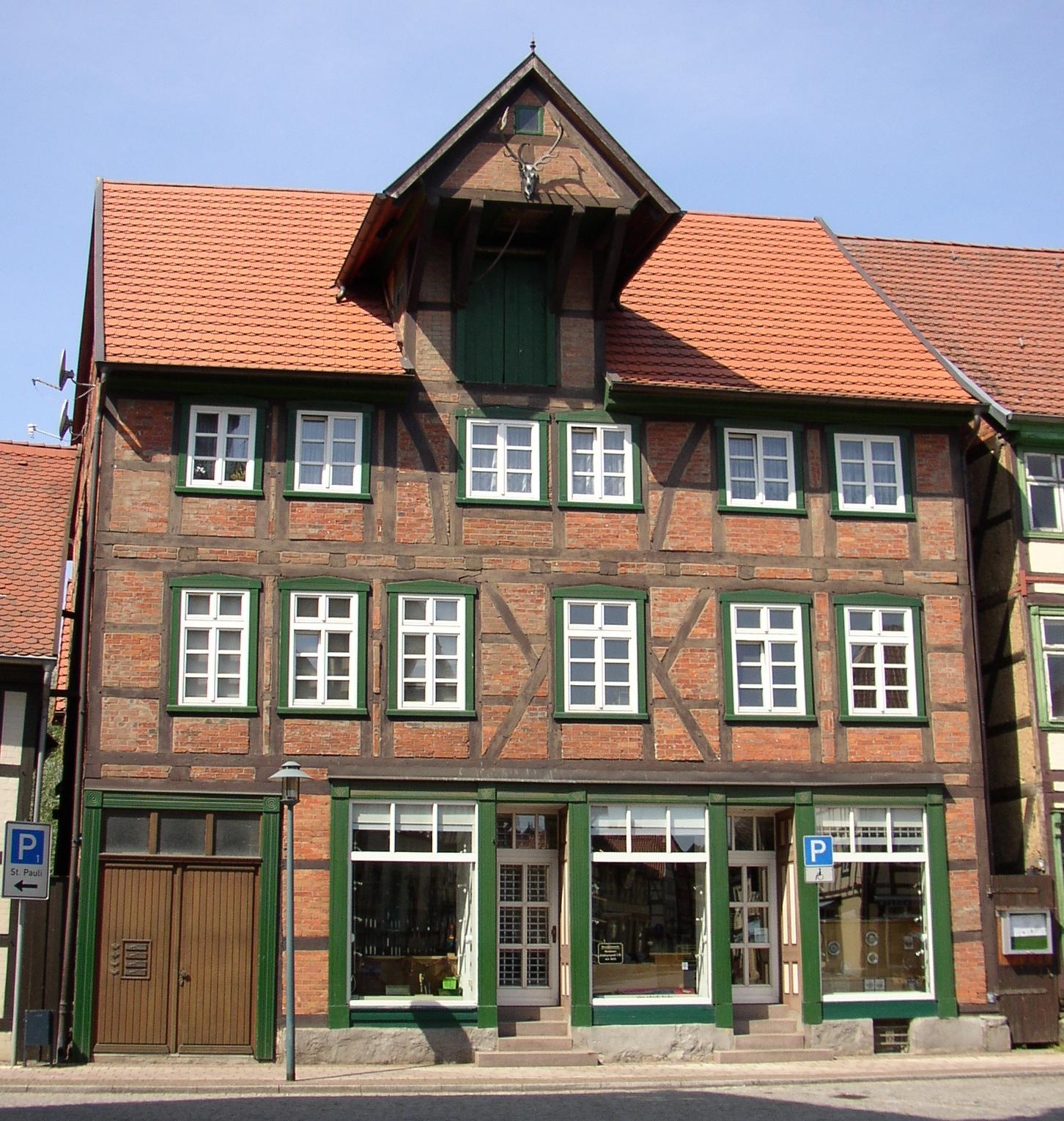
Pferdemarkt 5, the "Zwerchhaus"

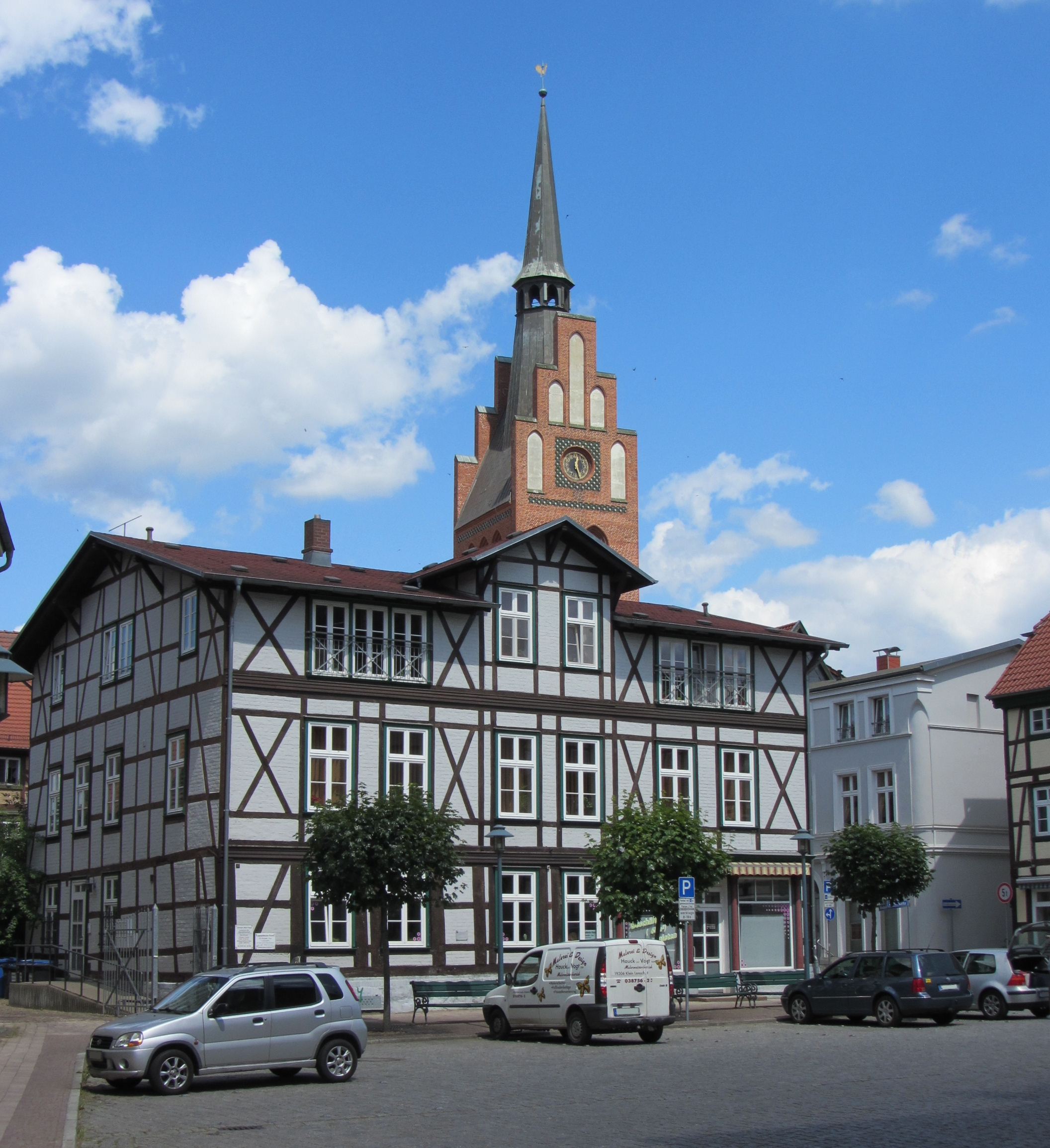
Pferdemarkt 2

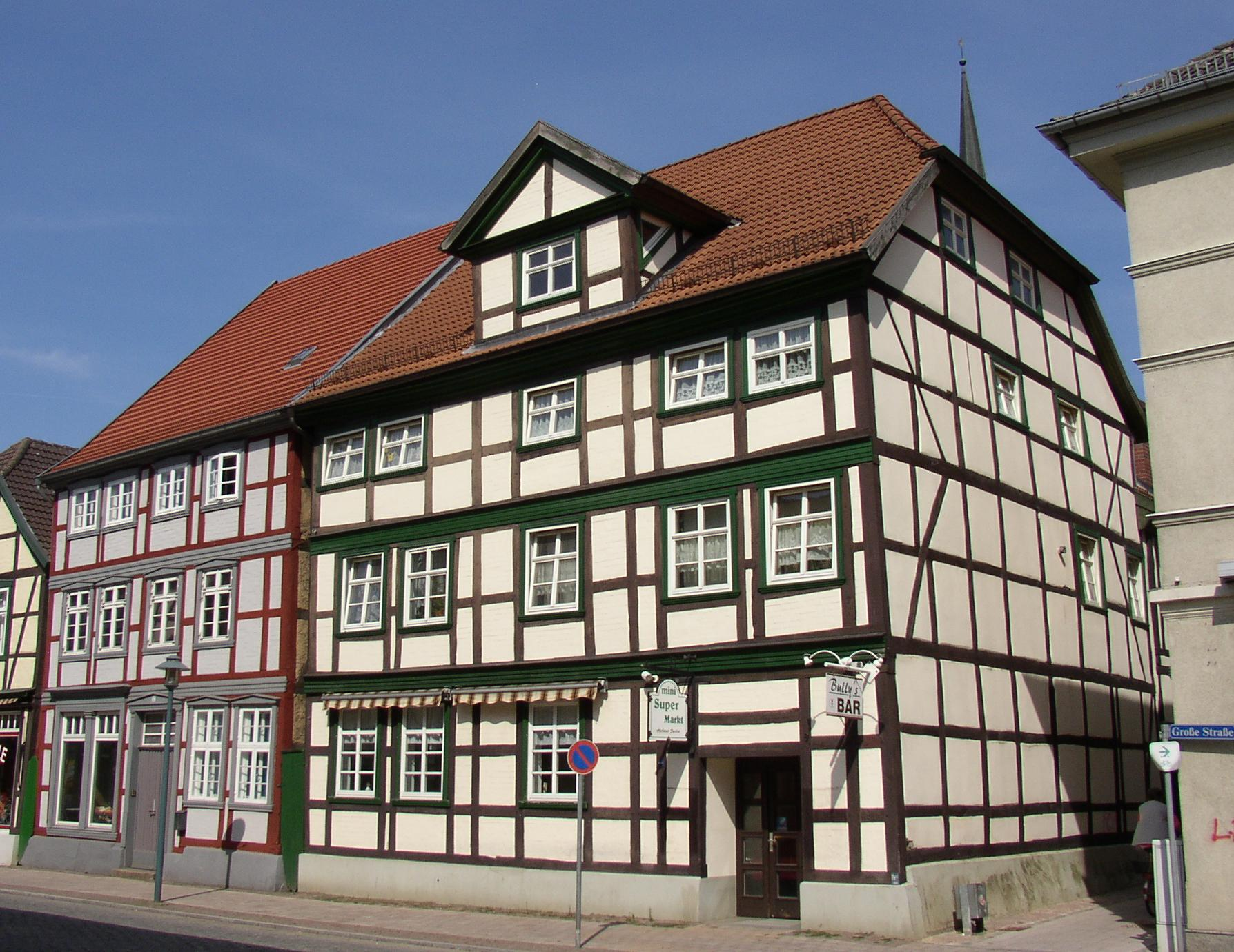
Building on the Große Straße

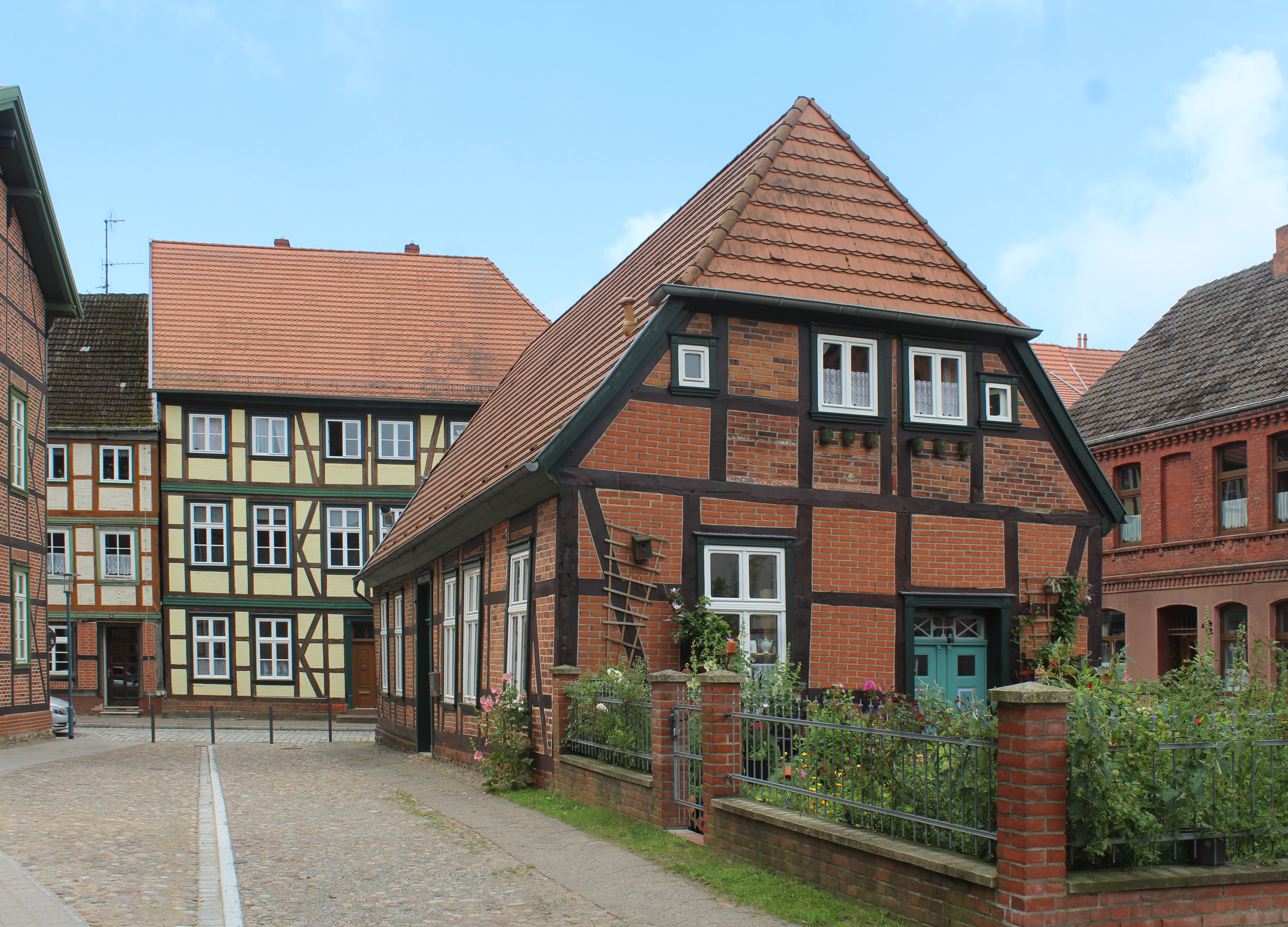
Kichenplatz

== Twin towns ==
Grabow is twinned with:

- Albertslund, Denmark
- Borken, Germany
- Whitstable, United Kingdom
- Říčany, Czech Republic
- Mölndal, Sweden

== Notable people ==
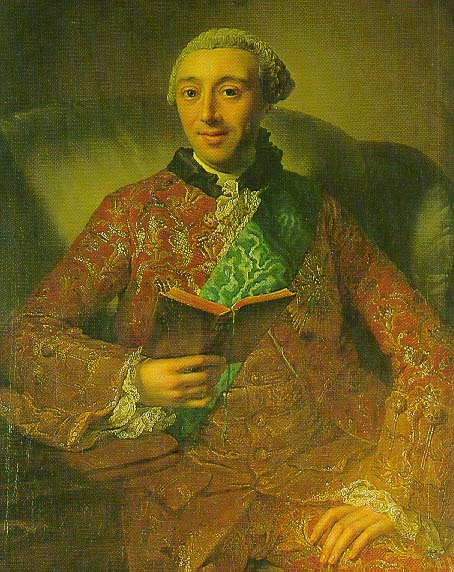
Duke Louis of Mecklenburg-Schwerin

=== Aristocracy ===
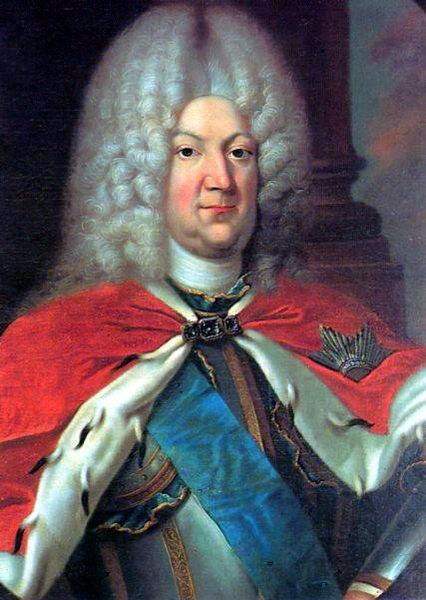
Karl Leopold, Duke of Mecklenburg-Schwerin

- Frederick, Duke of Mecklenburg-Grabow (1638–1688), resided in Grabow from 1669 until his death
- Adolphus Frederick II, Duke of the Mecklenburg-Strelitz (1658–1708), reigning duke of the Mecklenburg-Strelitz
- Karl Leopold, Duke of Mecklenburg-Schwerin (1678–1747), reigning duke in Mecklenburg-Schwerin
- Christian Ludwig II, Duke of Mecklenburg-Schwerin (1683–1756), reigning duke in Mecklenburg-Schwerin
- Sophia Louise of Mecklenburg-Schwerin (1685–1735), Queen of Prussia
- Louis, Hereditary Prince of Mecklenburg-Schwerin (1725–1778), hereditary prince of Mecklenburg-Schwerin

=== Arts ===
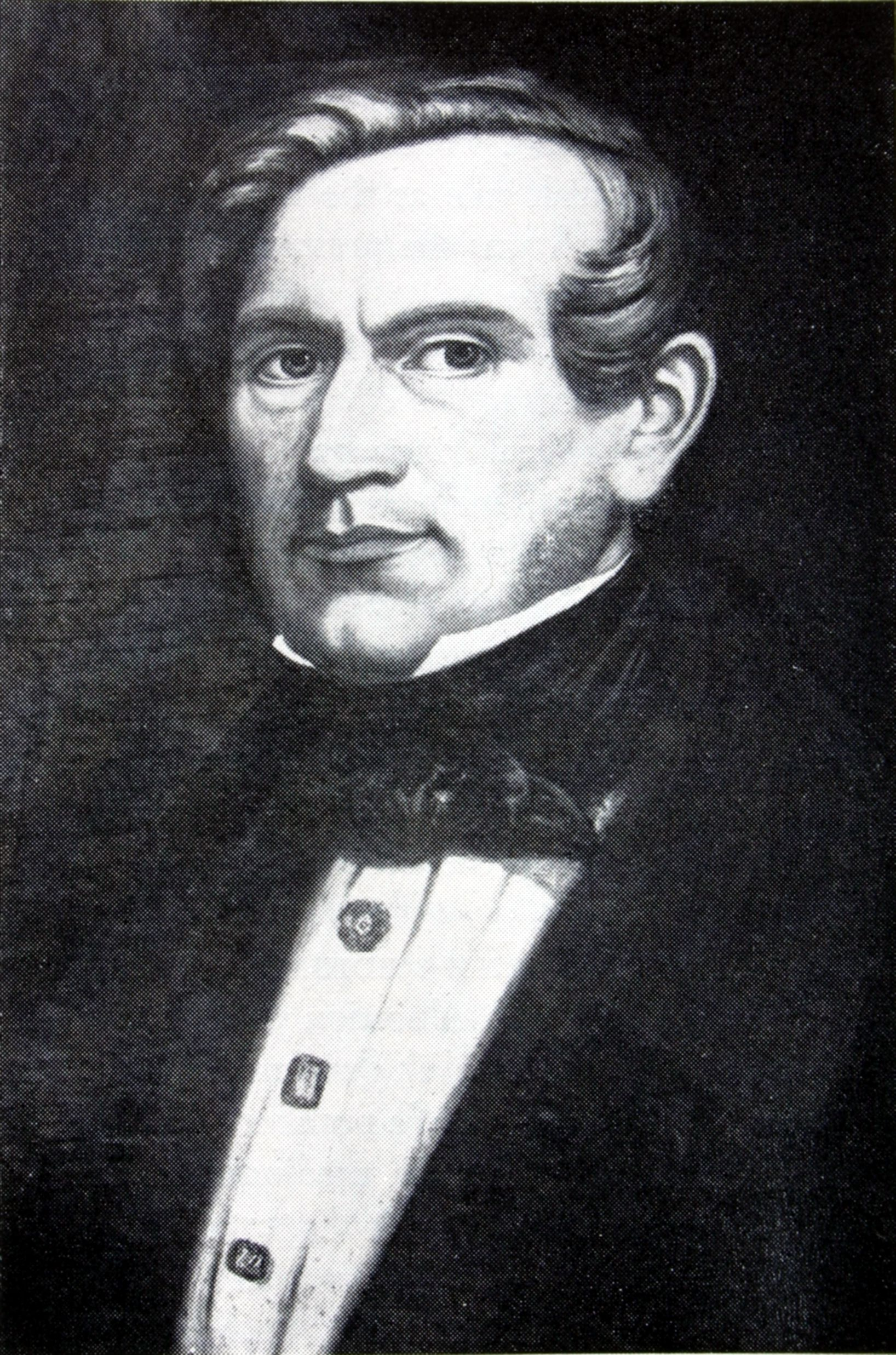
Wilhelm Langschmidt

- The Mann family, a Hanseatic family is partially connected to Grabow
- Friedrich Lenthe (1774–1851), painter and lithographer
- Wilhelm Langschmidt (1805–1866), German-South African painter
- Carl Ludwig Theodor Graff (1844–1906), architect
- Gustav Hinrichs (1850–1942), German-American conductor and composer
- Martha Rose-Grabow (1858–1940), painter
- Wilhelmine Fleck (1864–1997), writer
- Richard Havemann (1875–1943), animal tamer & trainer
- Gustav Ritter (1867–1945), factory owner and author
- Paul Sprenk (1898–1988), painter
- Katharina Brauren (1910–1998), actress
- Hermann Schepler (1911–1993), painter and graphic designer
- Volkwin Marg (born 1936), architect who partially lived in Grabow

=== Politics ===
- Franz Floerke (1811–1889), jurist and former mayor of Grabow (1839–1889)
- Karl Hahn (1858–1946), music teacher and botanist
- Joseph Marcus (1886–1961), jurist and Zionist activist
- Willi Fründt (1909–1944), communist executed by the Nazis
- Bernhard Leverenz (1909–1987), jurist and politician (FDP)
- Alwin Ziel (born 1941), politician (SPD)
- Stefan Sternberg (born 1984), Landrat of Ludwigslust-Parchim since 2018 and former mayor of Grabow (2013–2018)

=== Science ===
- Heinrich Zander (1800–1976), ornithologist and pastor
- Otto Plath (1885–1940), German-American biologist
- Hans Havemann (1887–1985), writer, journalist, and geologist
- Wilhelm Jesse (1887–1971), teacher and historian
- Willy Havemann (1892–1969), medical practitioner and local historian
- Oskar Kurz (1896–1945), local historian
- Helmut Pankow (1929–1996), botanist and university professor

=== Sports ===
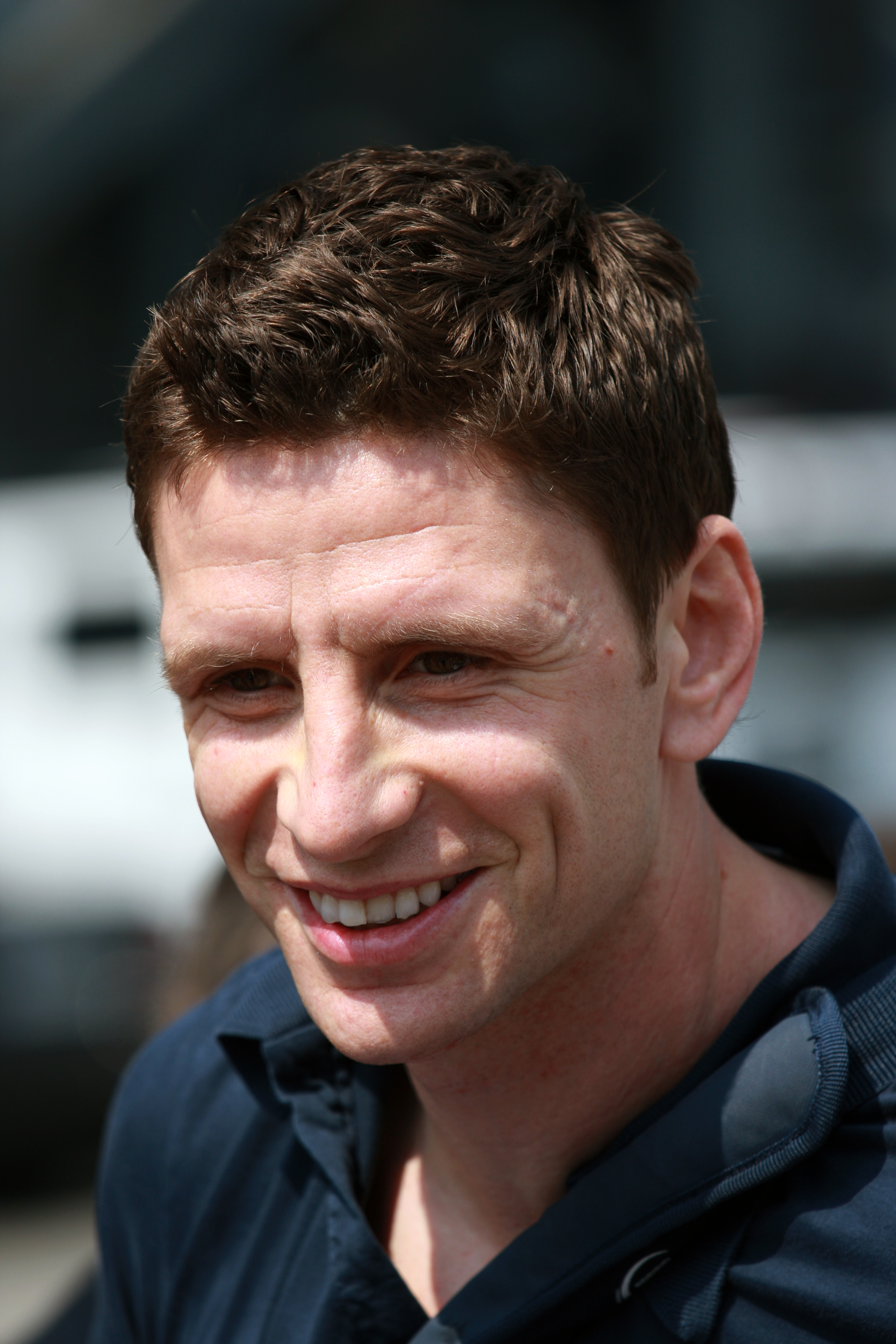
Bastian Reinhardt

- Bastian Reinhardt (born 1975), footballer, played at Empor Grabow, now assistant manager of VfB Lübeck
- Marco Küntzel (born 1976), footballer, played from 1981 to 1990 at Empor Grabow

=== Others ===
- Hermann Joachim Hahn (1679–1726), Protestant theologian at the Dresden Kreuzkirche
- Carl Bolbrügge (1849–1898), owner of the Bolbrüggesche Mühle
- Hans Eberhard (1861–1940), judge

== Bibliography ==
- Madus, Christian (1999). Grabow. Geschichte und Gegenwart (2nd ed.). Schwerin: Stock & Stein. ISBN 978-3-932370-49-6
