= Gorlosen =

- Municipality
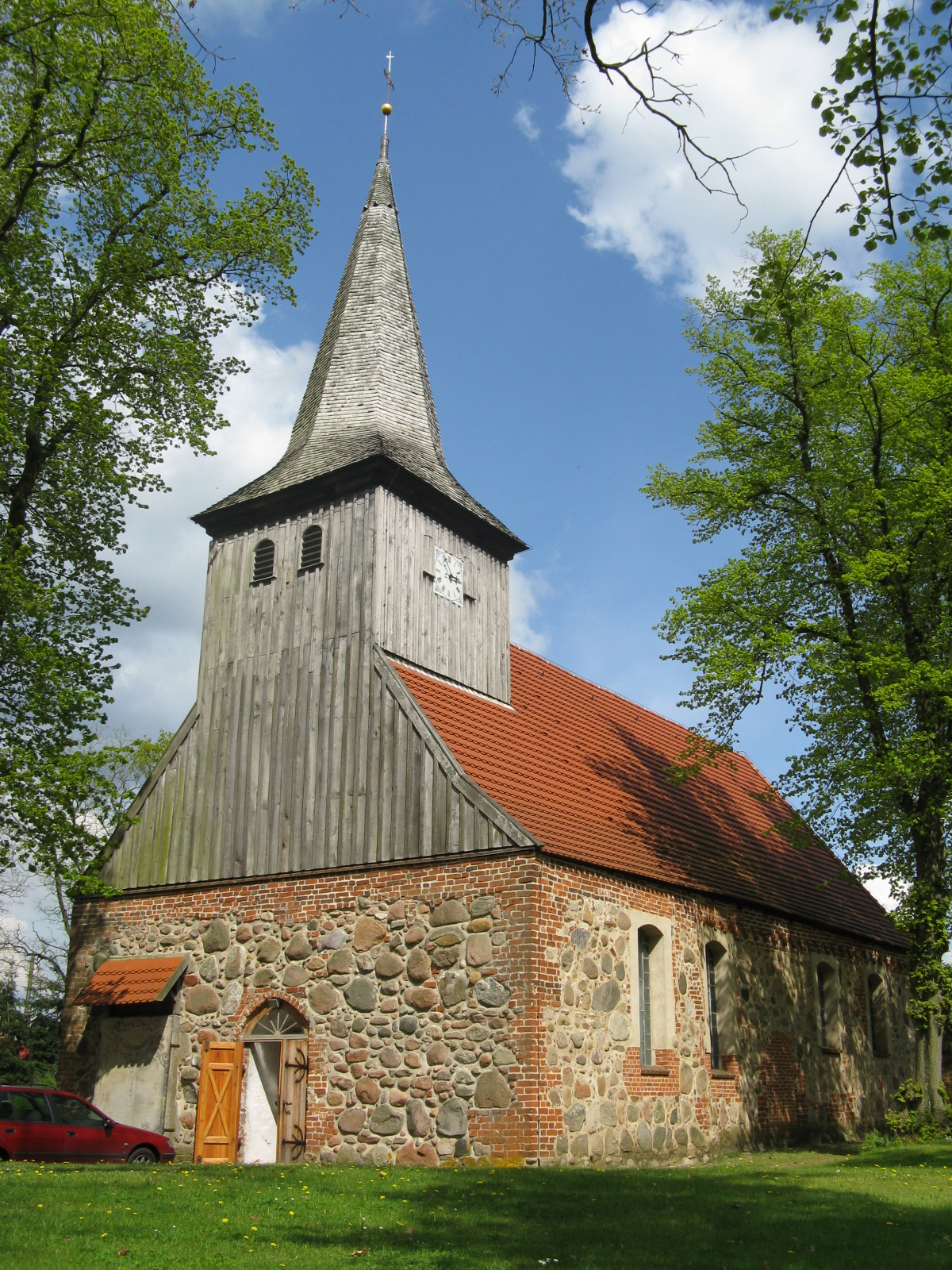
- Church in Gorlosen

- Location of Gorlosen within Ludwigslust-Parchim district
- Interactive map of Gorlosen
- Location within Germany Location within Mecklenburg-Vorpommern
- Coordinates: 53°10′N 11°28′E
- Country: Germany
- State: Mecklenburg-Vorpommern
- District: Ludwigslust-Parchim
- Municipal assoc.: Grabow
- Subdivisions: 5

Government
  - Mayor: Thomas Bach (WG G-D)

Area
  - Total: 53.02 km^{2} (20.47 sq mi)
- Elevation: 20 m (66 ft)

Population (2025-12-31)
  - Total: 445
  - Density: 8.39/km^{2} (21.7/sq mi)
- Time zone: UTC+01:00 (CET)
  - Summer (DST): UTC+02:00 (CEST)
- Postal codes: 19294
- Dialling codes: 038755
- Vehicle registration: LWL
- Website: www.amt-grabow.de

Gorlosen is a municipality in the Ludwigslust-Parchim district, in Mecklenburg-Vorpommern, Germany. It is a member of the Amt Grabow and, via its district, the Hamburg Metropolitan Region.

== Geography ==
Gorlosen has an area of 53.1 square kilometres (20.5 sq mi) that is divided into a total of five ortsteile which, besides the village of Gorlosen itself, are: Boek, Dadow, Grittel, and Strassen. Geographically, the municipality is located in the Griese Gegend, not too far from the Elbtalaue region. The municipality's south-eastern border with Milow is formed by the Meynbach and Alte Elde rivers. The municipality's physical geography is characterized by the Eldetal and forests.

The B191 federal road lies 6 kilometres (3.7 mi) north of Gorlosen in the neighboring municipality of Eldena. The villages of Strassen and Gorlosen proper are connected to Eldena and Lenzen via the L07 state road.

Gorlosen borders Eldena to the north-west, Grabow to the north, Kremmin to the north-east, Milow to the south-west, Lenzen (Elbe) in the Prignitz district of Brandenburg to the south, and Neu Kaliß as well as Malk Göhren to the west. The village of Krinitz (municipality of Milow), which is located 2 kilometres (1.2 mi) south-east of Gorlosen proper and 1.2 kilometres (0.75 mi) north-east of Grittel, it lies directly on the municipality's border.

== History ==
The territory now occupied by the municipality was previously settled by the Linones, a Polabian tribe associated with the Obotrites. According archaeological finds were also made in the village.

Gorlosen was first mentioned in 1317 as Gorlose. It was also known by the names Gurlose (1334), Gorloess (1506), Gorlosen (1551), and Gorlosii (1561). The name likely comes from the Old Slavic words gora and lêsŭ, meaning "settlement by the forested hill". The settlement of Gorlosen is a Hufendorf.

Historically, Gorlosen was home to a legendary castle which was referenced by Karl May in his work Der beiden Quitzows letzte Fahrten.

On 1 July 1950, Boek, Grittel, and Strassen became part of Gorlosen. On 1 January 1974, the municipality of Krinitz (including the village of Görnitz) also became part of Gorlosen but re-gained independence in 1995 until finally becoming part of Milow in 2004. Dadow was annexed into Gorlosen on 13 June 2004.

== Demographics ==
As of 2024, Gorlosen has a population of 441 which is split between 214 (51.5%) male and 227 (48.5%) female. As of the 2022 German census, most residents (70.7% or 323 people) do not belong to one of Germany's two state-recognized churches while 28.7% (131 people) are protestants and 0.7% (3 people) are Catholic. As of that same census, 96.9% of residents (443 people) have German citizenship, while 1.8% (8 people) have Ukrainian citizenship and 1.3% (6 people) are holding another EU citizenship.

Historical population

Year	Pop.	±%
1843	226	—
1885	260	+15.0%
1901	278	+6.9%
1933	303	+9.0%
1939	260	−14.2%
1946	453	+74.2%

Year	Pop.	±%
1990	598	+32.0%
2001	571	−4.5%
2011	510	−10.7%
2013	525	+2.9%
2022	457	−13.0%
2024	441	−3.5%

Data may be affected by territorial fluctuation.
Sources: 1843, 1885, 1901, 1933 & 1939, 1946, 2013, 1990-2024

== Politics ==
=== Municipal council ===
The most recent elections for Gorlosen's municipal council were held on 9 June 2024, as part of the 2024 Mecklenburg-Vorpommern municipal elections, and yielded the following results:

Party	Votes	Share		Seats	
Party	Votes	%	+/-	Won	+/–
WG Gorlosen-Dadow	482	67.04	▼9.28	3	▼2
FF Boek/Gorlosen	237	32.96	New	2	▲2
Total	719	100.0		5	▼1
Valid votes	719	68.95			
Invalid/blank votes	60	7.63			
Total votes	779	100.0			
Turnout	262	68.95	▼2.51		
Eligible voters	380				

Previous elections had the following results:

Year Party	2024		2019	
Year Party	%	Seats	%	Seats
WG Gorlosen-Dadow	67.04	3	76.32	5
FF Boek/Gorlosen	32.96	2	Did not exist	
Independents	Did not run		23.68 (Note: In total. 14.90% for Doreen von Soosten; 4.81% for Andreas Makowsky; 3.97% for Gerhard Selle.)	1 (Note: Doreen von Soosten)
Total	100.0	5	100.0	6

=== Mayor ===
During the 2024 Mecklenburg-Vorpommern municipal elections, the incumbent mayor Kathrin Heiden (Ind.) was the only standing candidate but lost re-election with only 48.05% of the yes vote (50% is required). Instead, the newly elected municipal council selected one of its members to serve as mayor. The council chose Thomas Bach, a member of WG Gorlosen-Dadow, who has served as the municipality's mayor since.

== Gallery ==
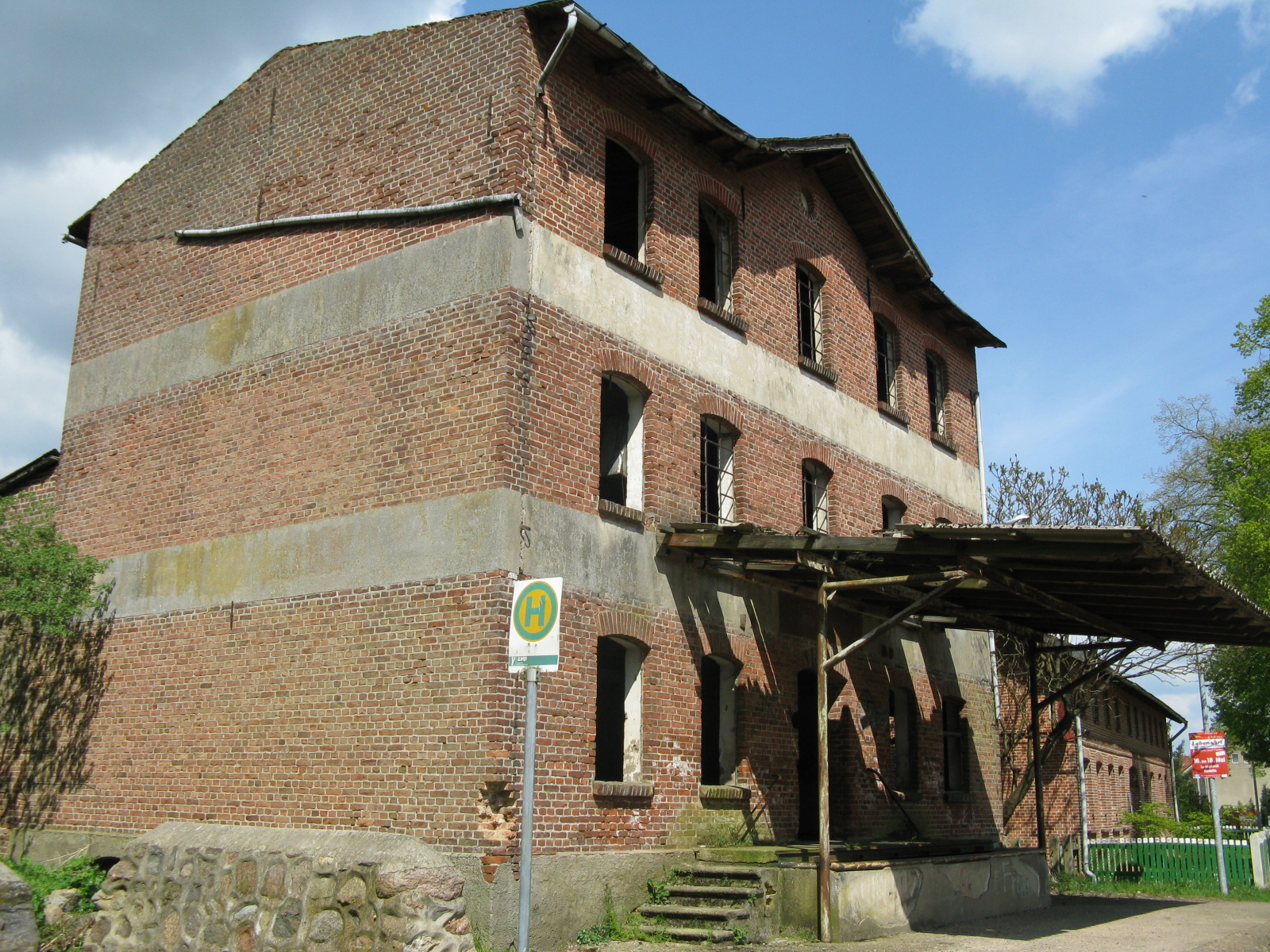
Ruin of the old mill

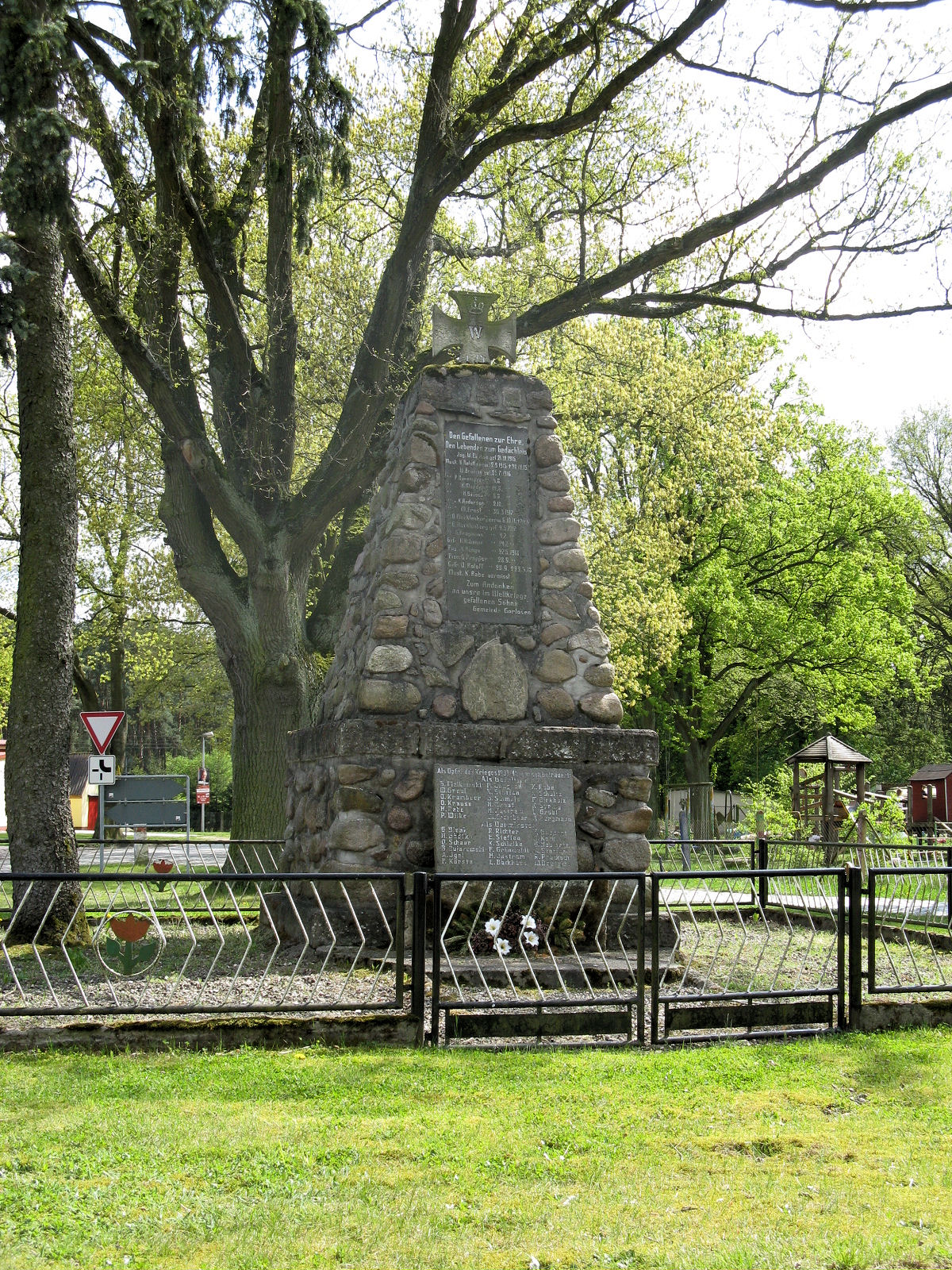
War memorial

== Notable people ==
- Erasmus Behm (1939–2007), internist and pharmacist
- Karl-Peter Schmidtke (born 1945), sprinter
