= Meynbach =

River in Germany

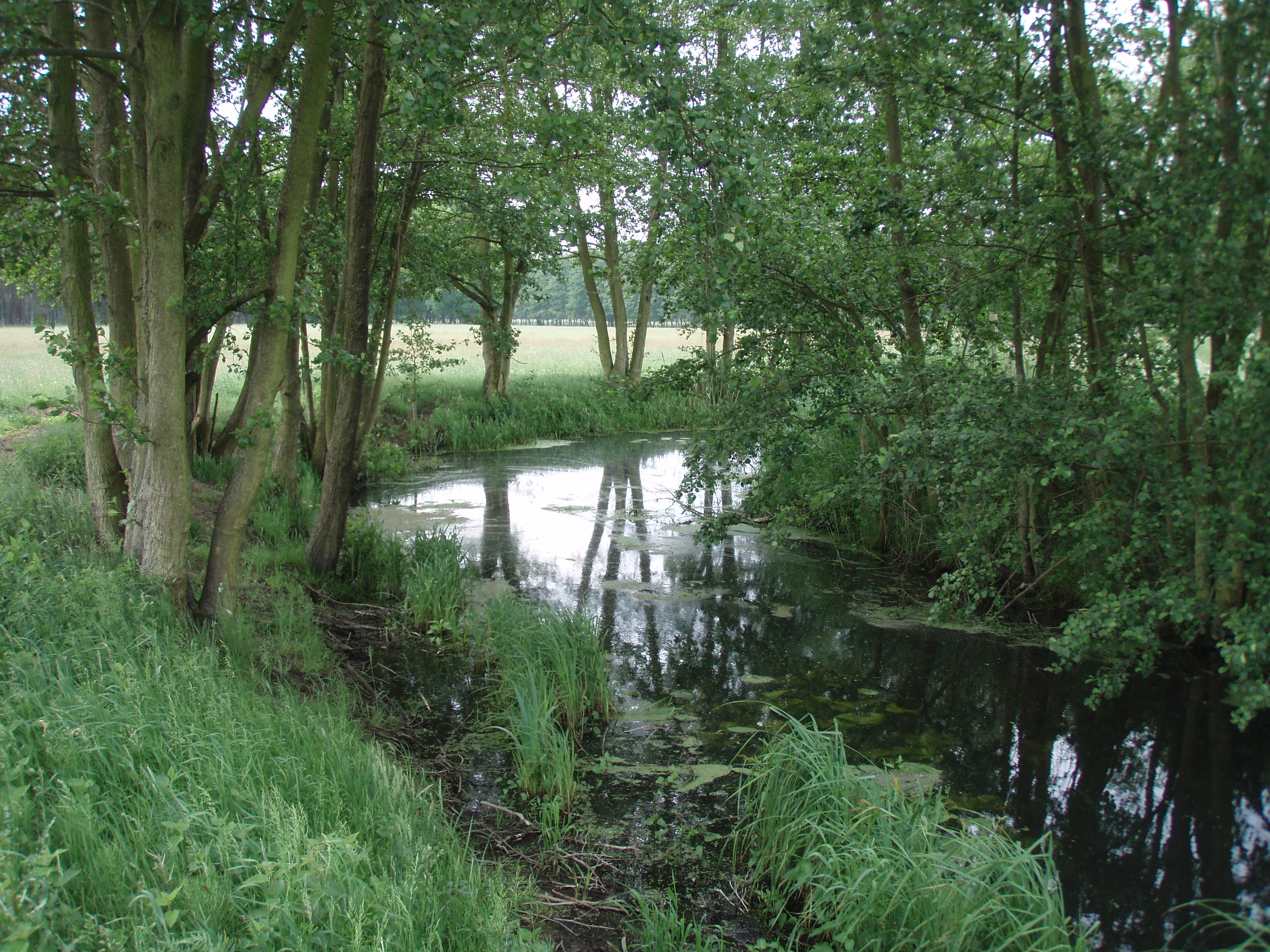
- The Meynbach near Krinitz (Milow)

Location
- Country: Germany
- States: Brandenburg; Mecklenburg-Vorpommern

Physical characteristics
- Source
  - coordinates: 53°14′21″N 11°39′06″E
- Mouth
  - location: Alte Elde
  - coordinates: 53.1693°N 11.4462°E

Basin features
- Progression: Alte Elde→ Löcknitz→ Elbe→ North Sea

Meynbach is a stream in northeastern Germany. It flows from its source near Hühnerland (municipality of Prislich) in a generally western direction along the border between Brandenburg and Mecklenburg-Vorpommern. It flows into the Alte Elde near Krinitz (municipality of Milow). A branch of the Meynbach flows from Hühnerland to the east, and joins the Tarnitz north of Reckenzin.

== Gallery ==
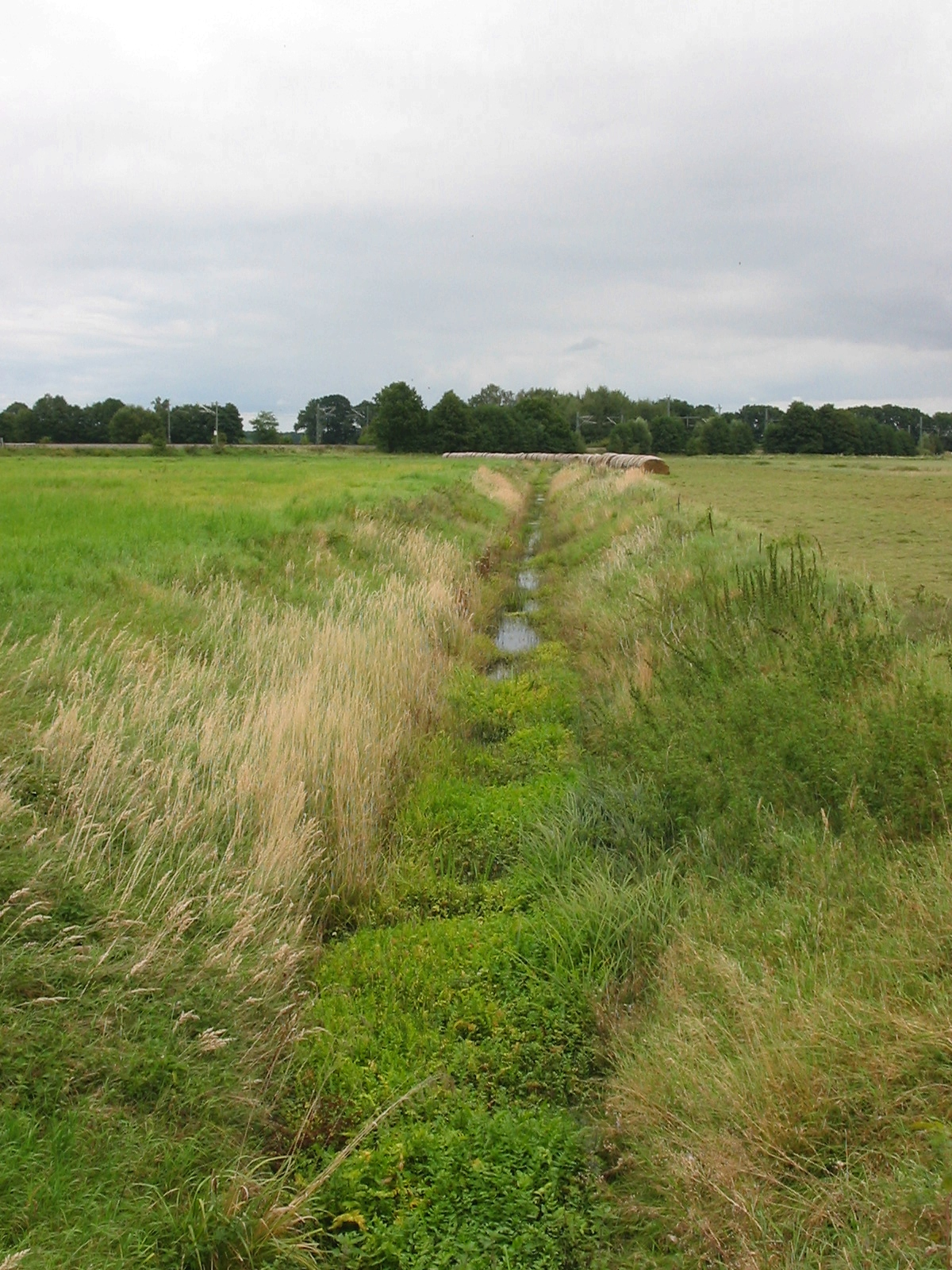
The Meynbach by Hühnerland near its origin point

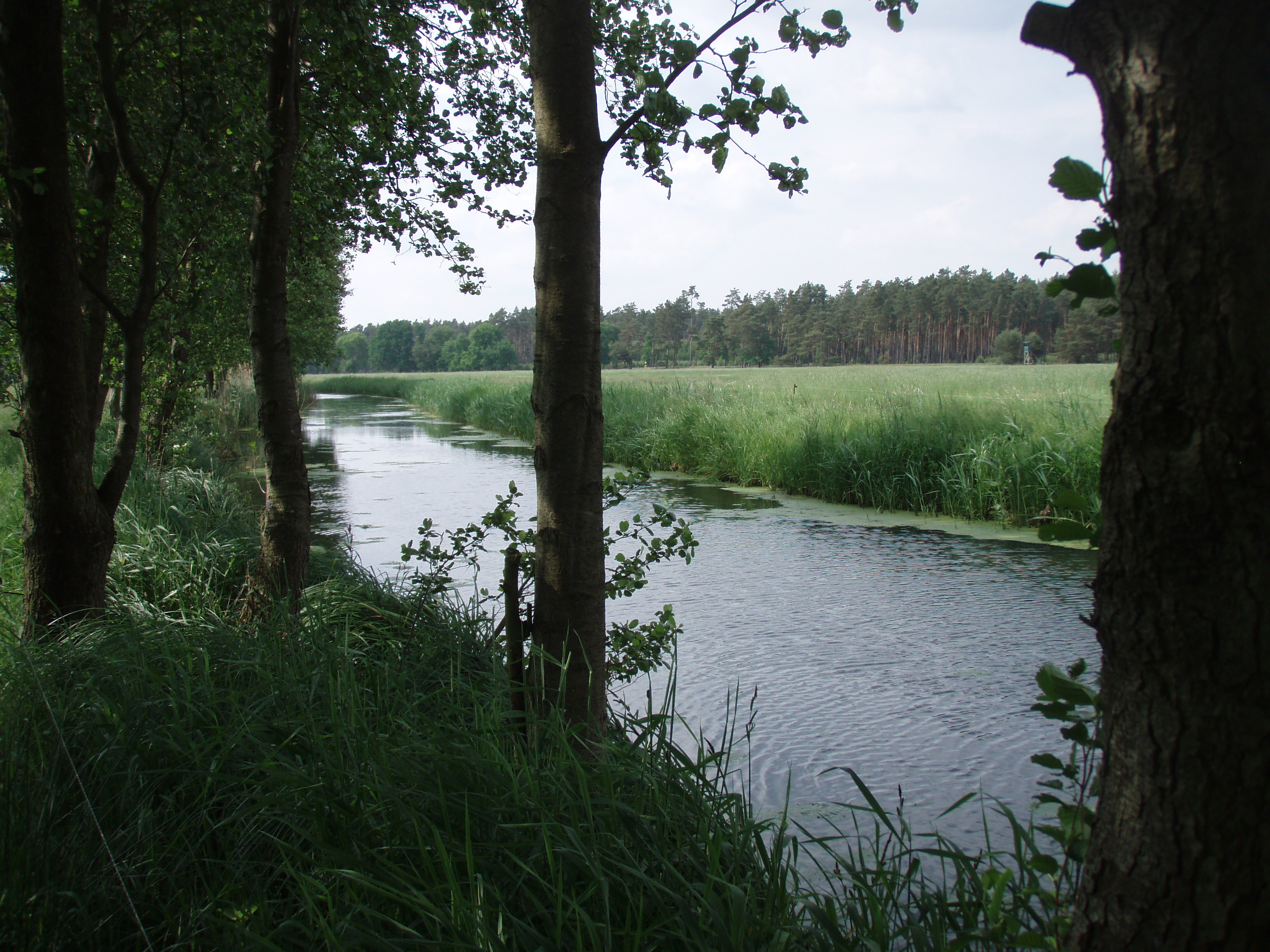
The Meynbach between Gorlosen and Krinitz by Hoppenhofs-Stücken

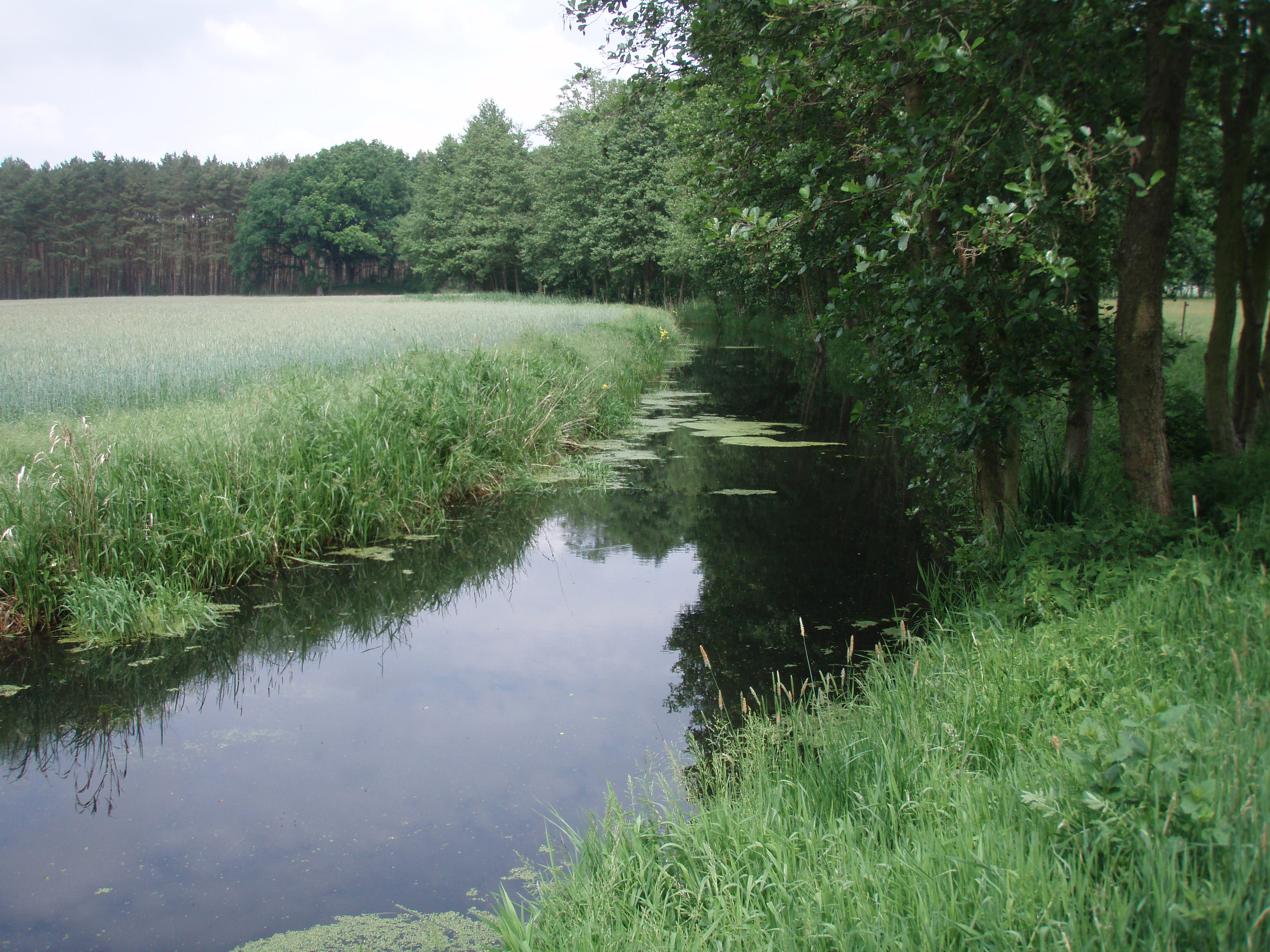
At the L07 bridge between Gorlosen and Krinitz, further downstream

== See also ==
- List of rivers of Brandenburg
- List of rivers of Mecklenburg-Vorpommern
- List of lakes of Ludwigslust-Parchim
