= Klein Warnow station =

Railway station in Karstädt, Germany

Klein Warnow
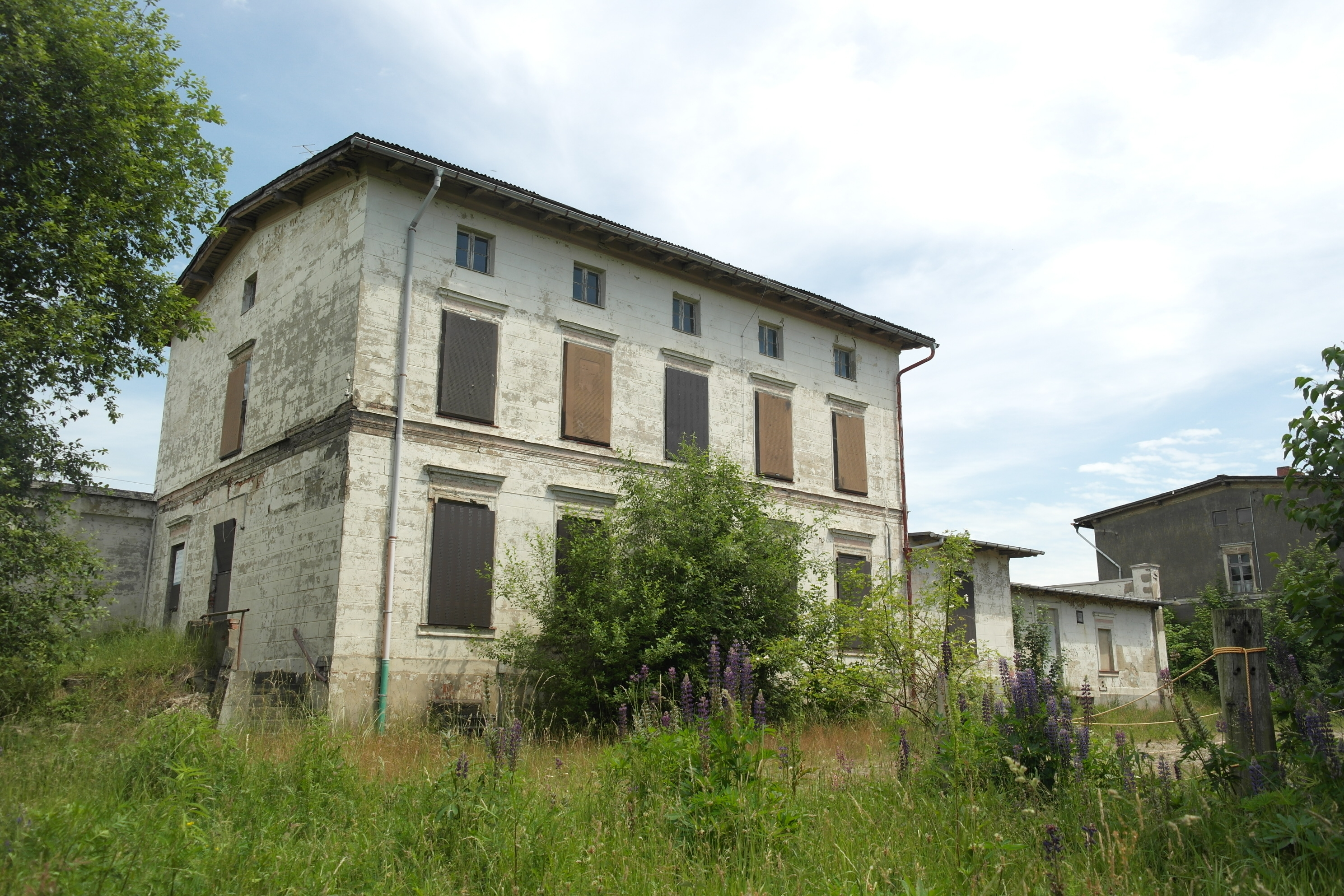
- Entrance building with goods shed

General information
- Location: Klein Warnow, Karstädt, Brandenburg; Germany
- Coordinates: 53°14′11″N 11°39′48″E
- System: Through station
- Line: Berlin–Hamburg (KBS 204)
- Platforms: 0, formerly 2

Construction
- Architectural style: Neoclassical

Other information
- Station code: n/a
- DS100 code: WKWA

History
- Opened: 15 October 1846; 179 years ago
- Closed: 0 December 1994; 32 years ago
- Electrified: 30 May 1987; 39 years ago, 15 kV 16 2/3 Hz AC system (overhead)
- Former names: 1846-1938 Wendisch Warnow
Location
- Location within Brandenburg

Klein Warnow station (called Wendisch Warnow until 1938) is a former station on the Berlin–Hamburg railway in the town of Klein Warnow in the German state of Brandenburg. The station was most important during its first 20 years of operation after its opening in 1846/47, when it was the Prussian border station at the border with Mecklenburg. Since the abandonment of passenger services in 1993, the station has only served corporate purposes. The station building and a number of other buildings have heritage protection.

== Location ==
The station is located at kilometre 154.8 of the Berlin–Hamburg railway in the village of Klein Warnow, which is now in the municipality of Karstädt in the Brandenburg district of Prignitz. A few hundred metres north-west of the station the railway crosses the Meynbach, the historical border of Mecklenburg and forming the present border of the state of Mecklenburg-Vorpommern. It is about a km away to the village of Hühnerland in Mecklenburg and seven km to the nearest town, Grabow. The municipal town of Karstädt is about ten km to the south.

== History ==
Although only a few people lived in Wendisch Warnow, a railway station was built there because of its location on the border of Mecklenburg. On 15 October 1846, the first stage of the Berlin–Hamburg railway was opened between Berlin and Boizenburg (then spelt Boitzenburg). Just a month ago before the "regulations on the treatment of the transport of commodities and materials on the Berlin–Hamburg railway in terms of customs" had been released on 11 September 1846 with the relevant provisions for the customs clearance of trains at the border of Mecklenburg. A customs office was opened in Wendisch Warnow, which was subordinate to the main customs office on the road in Warnow (now Groß Warnow). There was an additional main customs office for rail traffic in Wittenberge.

On 15 December 1846, passenger services were extended to Hamburg and freight traffic began in the new year. Originally, the station in Wendisch Warnow served only for the carrying out of customs formalities, but it was released after a short time, probably as early as 1847, for public transport.

In passenger transport, passengers were checked on the train between Wendisch Warnow and Wittenberge and their luggage had to be stowed in the baggage car with the exception of hand luggage before reaching Wendisch Warnow. Freight traffic was checked at the stations in Wendisch Warnow, Wittenberge and Berlin. Wendisch Warnow was primarily responsible for the control and taxation of cattle imported into Prussia. In 1855, 16,019 head of cattle were checked in Wendisch Warnow; a year earlier, only 5,678 head of cattle had been handled. It was said in relation to this significant increase at Wendisch Warnow and the adjacent border crossing on the road:

In recent years there has been a great deal of marketing of livestock from the main administrative district of Warnow; in particular 56 oxen, 6649 fattened pigs and 8213 sheep have been imported, more from abroad than in 1854, and primarily intended for Berlin. It is said that the reason for the increase, specifically a greater need for fat pigs from Mecklenburg, was because cattle dealers from Moldavia and Wallachia had stayed away almost entirely.

— Prussian trade archive. Weekly for trade, commerce and transport agencies. According to official sources. Berlin, 1856

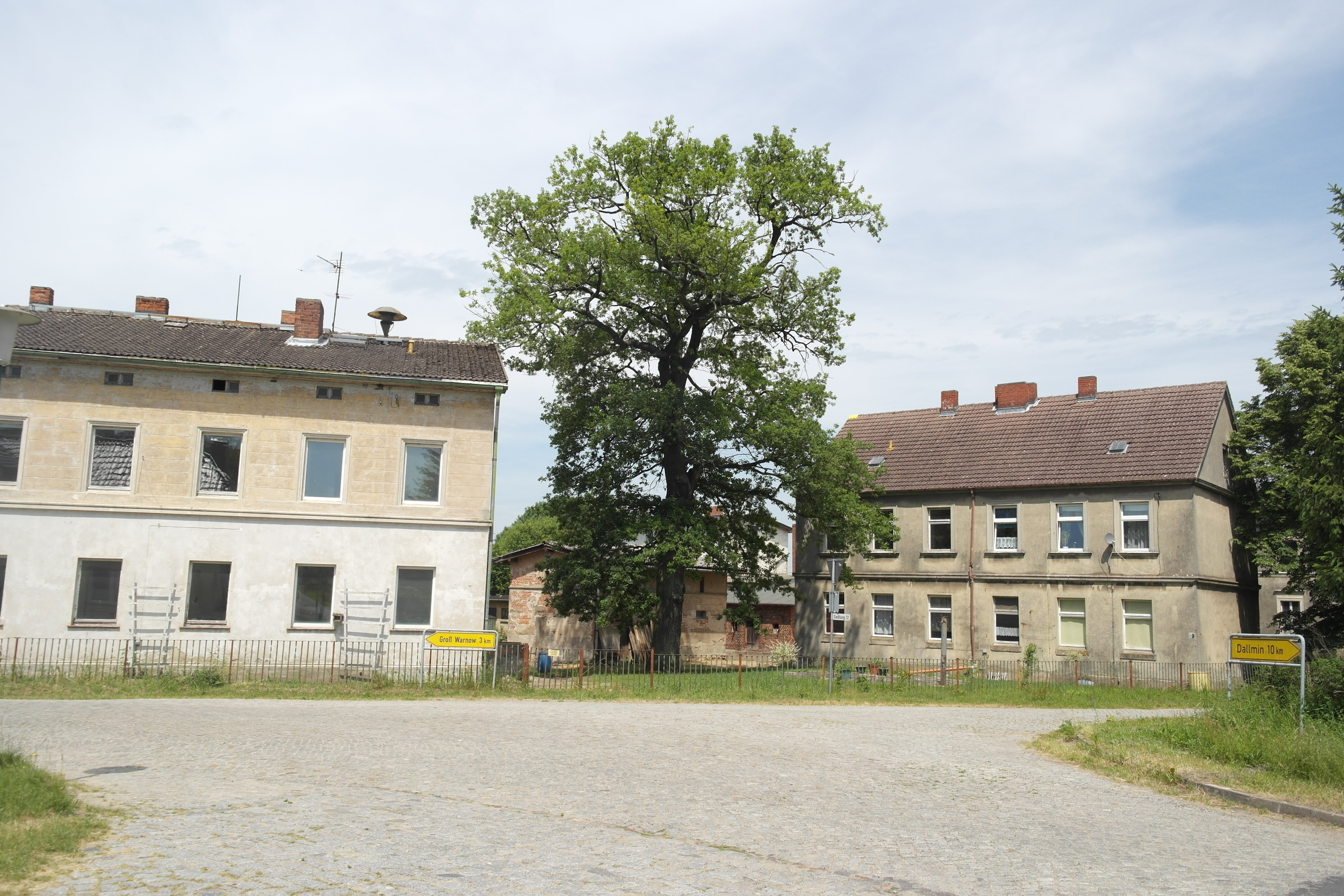
Two listed official residences of the village street

Because of customs clearance formalities, all trains running between Berlin and Hamburg stopped in Wendisch Warnow. In the 1855 timetable, Wendisch Warnow station was served by seven pairs of passenger trains each day, including the fast mail train.

With the formation of the North German Confederation and Mecklenburg and Lübeck joining the Zollverein (customs union) in 1868, the border and customs formalities became unnecessary. On 28 August 1868, the Prussian Ministry of Finance announced that on "the day on which totally free circulation of goods commences with Mecklenburg and Lübeck" the customs office in Wendisch Warnow would be closed. The main customs office in Warnow was also closed.

The station rapidly lost importance. It had the lowest patronage on the Berlin–Hamburg line in 1868 with 4,631 passengers at the station. However, there were two residences of officials at the station. Freight operations at the station were usually insignificant after the end of the customs border. In 1867, it was announced that a branch line would be built from station to the nearby lignite mines of St. Paul and Walter, the first "direct rail connection" in the RegierungsbezirkPotsdam (an administrative district then surrounding Berlin). However, the pits were closed in 1870 because the poor quality lignite could not be sold.

Wendisch Warnow was subsequently served only by some of the passenger trains with four pairs of trains a day stopping there in the 1880s. Approximately this frequency of service remained for more than a hundred years, with a slight increase in the period between the world wars until the end of passenger services.

The village and station of Wendisch Warnow were renamed Klein (small) Warnow in 1937. The railway line was electrified through the station in 1987. Passenger services at the station ended in 1994; freight had been abandoned in 1976. Since the upgrade of the line the station no longer serves the public, although its tracks are still used for operational purposes.

== Infrastructure ==
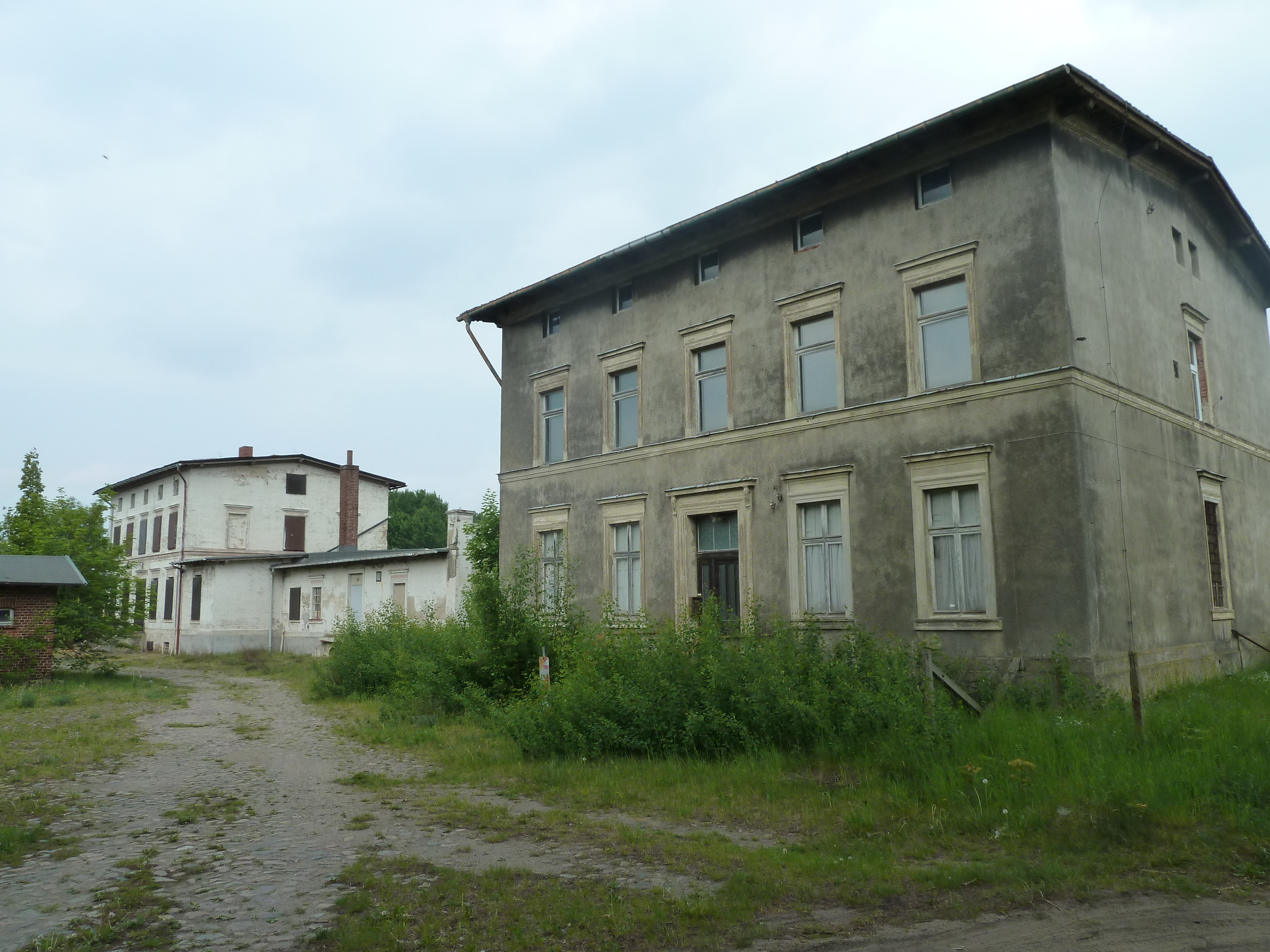
The entrance building (background), an almost identical designed house (foreground) and the paving are heritage-listed.

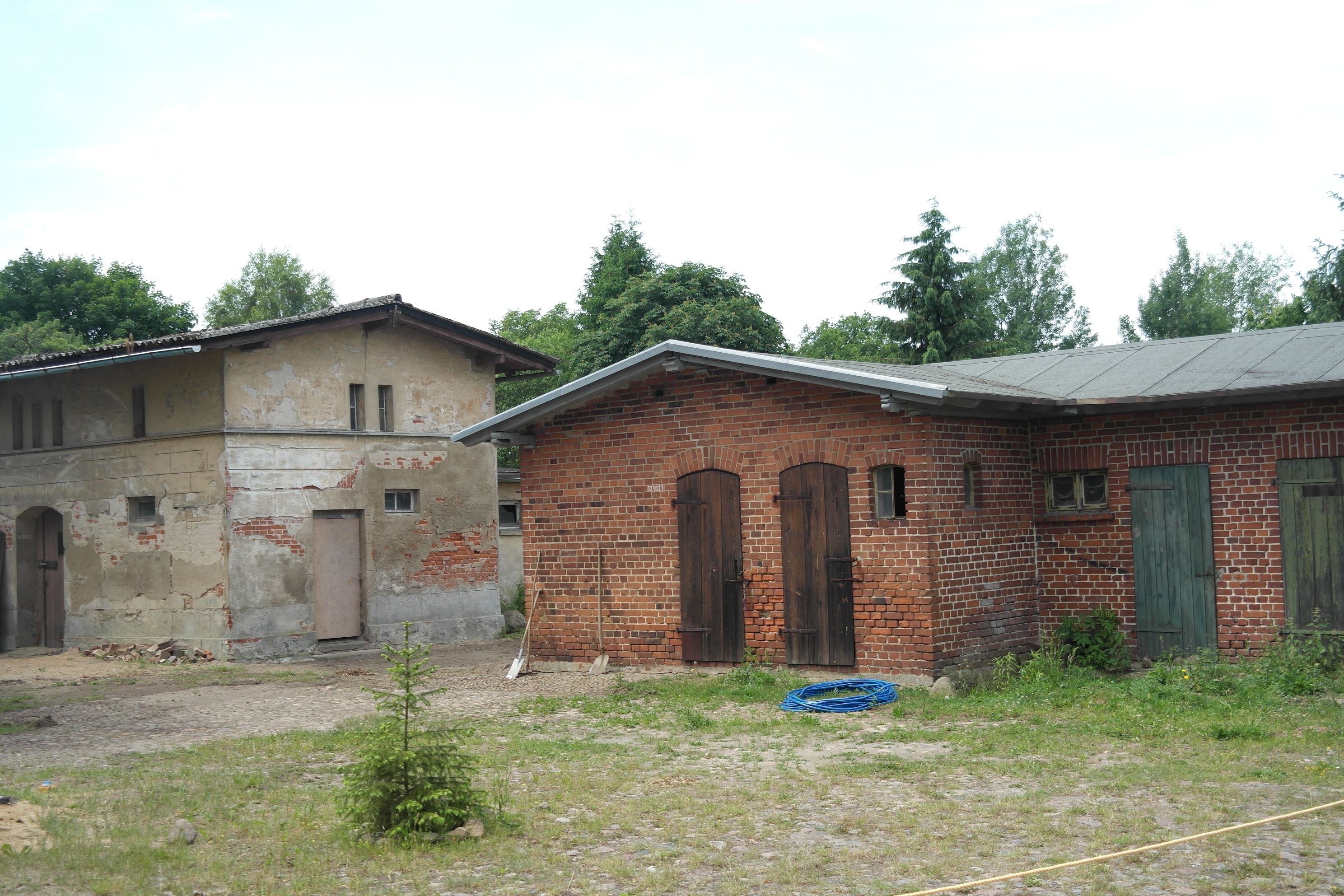
Listed outbuildings

The station building is a two-story building with a low-pitched gable roof, consisting of five portals on its long side and three portals in the transverse direction. On the ground floor, the wall behind the platform continues to the southeast to connect with the goods shed. The style corresponds to the other station buildings on the Berlin–Hamburg railway that were designed by Friedrich Neuhaus and Ferdinand Wilhelm Holz. The platform roof in front of station building and the goods shed are no longer maintained.

Southeast of the station building is an official residence of the railway, which has a similar design to the station building. Continuing south on the village street there are two other houses for rail officials nearby. A number of smaller outbuildings complete the ensemble.

Since 2005, the station has had heritage protection. The protected ensemble is "Klein Warnow station, consisting of entrance building, goods sheds, three official residences, four outbuildings, oven and the paving on the forecourt".

The station building and the adjacent residential building for officials are empty; the other two houses and some of the outbuildings are privately used (as of the summer of 2013). The meadow on the village street includes the listed oven, a more than century-old bush oven (Buschbackofen), which was built by the Groß Warnow village association. An oven festival (Backofenfest) is held here every year.

The station originally had a main platform next to the entrance building and the island platform for trains heading north could be reached from this. Today, the complex consists of the two through tracks and a passing loop on the northeast side with connecting sets of points.
