= Tarnitz =

River in Germany

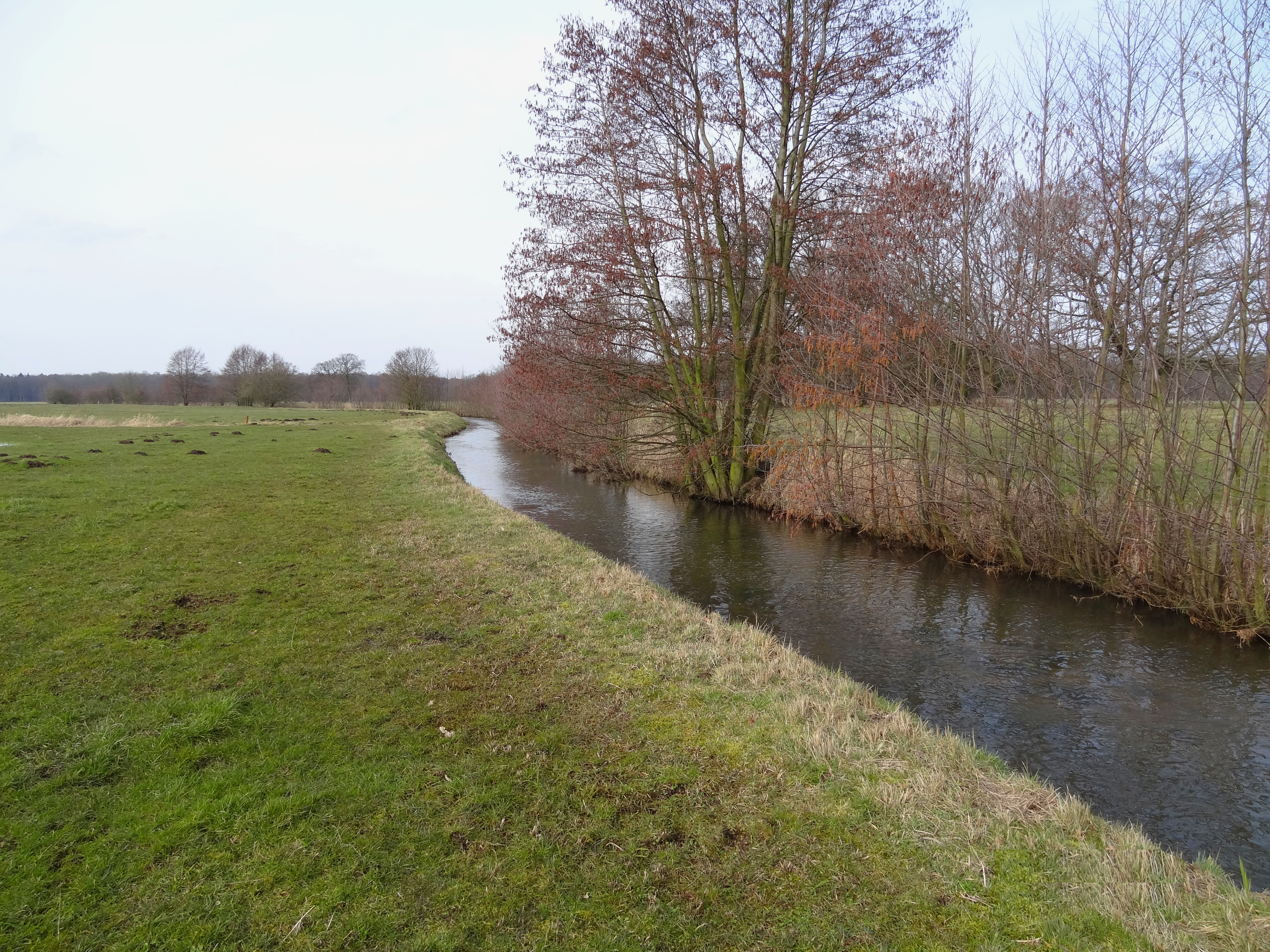

Location
- Country: Germany
- States: Mecklenburg-Vorpommern; Brandenburg

Physical characteristics
- Source
  - location: between Muchow and Stolpe
  - coordinates: 53°19′53″N 11°42′29″E
  - elevation: ca. 42 m above sea level (NHN)
- Mouth
  - location: near Streesow into the Löcknitz
  - coordinates: 53°13′10″N 11°43′39″E
  - elevation: 26.2 m above sea level (NHN)
- Length: 14 km (8.7 mi)

Basin features
- Progression: Löcknitz→ Elbe→ North Sea
- Tributaries
  - right: Meynbach
- Navigable: no

The Tarnitz (German pronunciation: [ˈtaʁnɪts]) is a tributary of the Löcknitz in southwest Mecklenburg-Vorpommern and north Brandenburg in Germany.

The roughly 14-kilometre-long (8.7 mi) river has its source in a small, wooded area on the municipal boundary between Muchow and Stolpe at an elevation of about 42 metres (138 ft) above sea level. From here the Tarnitz flows initially for about a kilometre in a southwestern and then southern direction, running east of the villages of Muchow and Zierzow. In the parish of Prislich meadows and larger woods frame its river banks, otherwise it runs almost entirely through arable fields from which many ditches drain into the Tarnitz. On the state border between Mecklenburg-Vorpommern and Brandenburg it is joined from the west by the Meynbach. From here on the Tarnitz in a southeasterly direction on Brandenburg territory, then forms a short section of the state border and discharges into the Löcknitz near Streesow. The river descends about 16 metres (52 ft) over its length.

The Mecklenburg-Vorpommern Advisory State Programme (Gutachtliche Landesprogramm Mecklenburg-Vorpommern) from 2003 describes the Tarnitz, which has been straighted along almost all its length, as not very natural (naturfern).

== See also ==
- List of rivers of Brandenburg
- List of rivers of Mecklenburg-Vorpommern
