= Muchow =

- Municipality
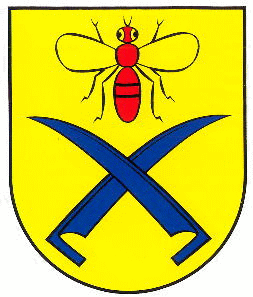
- Flag Coat of arms

- Location of Muchow within Ludwigslust-Parchim district
- Interactive map of Muchow
- Location within Germany Location within Mecklenburg-Vorpommern
- Coordinates: 53°19′N 11°40′E
- Country: Germany
- State: Mecklenburg-Vorpommern
- District: Ludwigslust-Parchim
- Municipal assoc.: Grabow

Government
  - Mayor: Karsten Grimm

Area
  - Total: 19.05 km^{2} (7.36 sq mi)
- Elevation: 37 m (121 ft)

Population (2025-12-31)
  - Total: 285
  - Density: 15.0/km^{2} (38.7/sq mi)
- Time zone: UTC+01:00 (CET)
  - Summer (DST): UTC+02:00 (CEST)
- Postal codes: 19300
- Dialling codes: 038752
- Vehicle registration: LWL
- Website: www.amt-grabow.de

Muchow is a municipality in the Ludwigslust-Parchim district, in Mecklenburg-Vorpommern, Germany.

== Geography and transport links ==
The parish which is surrounded by fields lies in a sparsely populated region ten kilometres southeast of Neustadt-Glewe and 10 kilometres northeast of Grabow. The Müritz-Elde Aqueduct runs along the western boundary of the parish. A small river, the Tarnitz flows south through the area to join the Löcknitz. The Bundesautobahn 24 may be reached via the junction of Neustadt-Glewe about 10 kilometres away.
