= Möllenbeck =

Möllenbeck may refer to the following places in Germany:

- Möllenbeck, Ludwigslust, in the district of Ludwigslust, Mecklenburg-Vorpommern
- Möllenbeck, Mecklenburg-Strelitz, in the Mecklenburg-Strelitz district, Mecklenburg-Vorpommern
- Möllenbeck, part of Rinteln in the Schaumburg district, Lower Saxony
