= Möllenbeck, Ludwigslust =

Möllenbeck
- Municipality
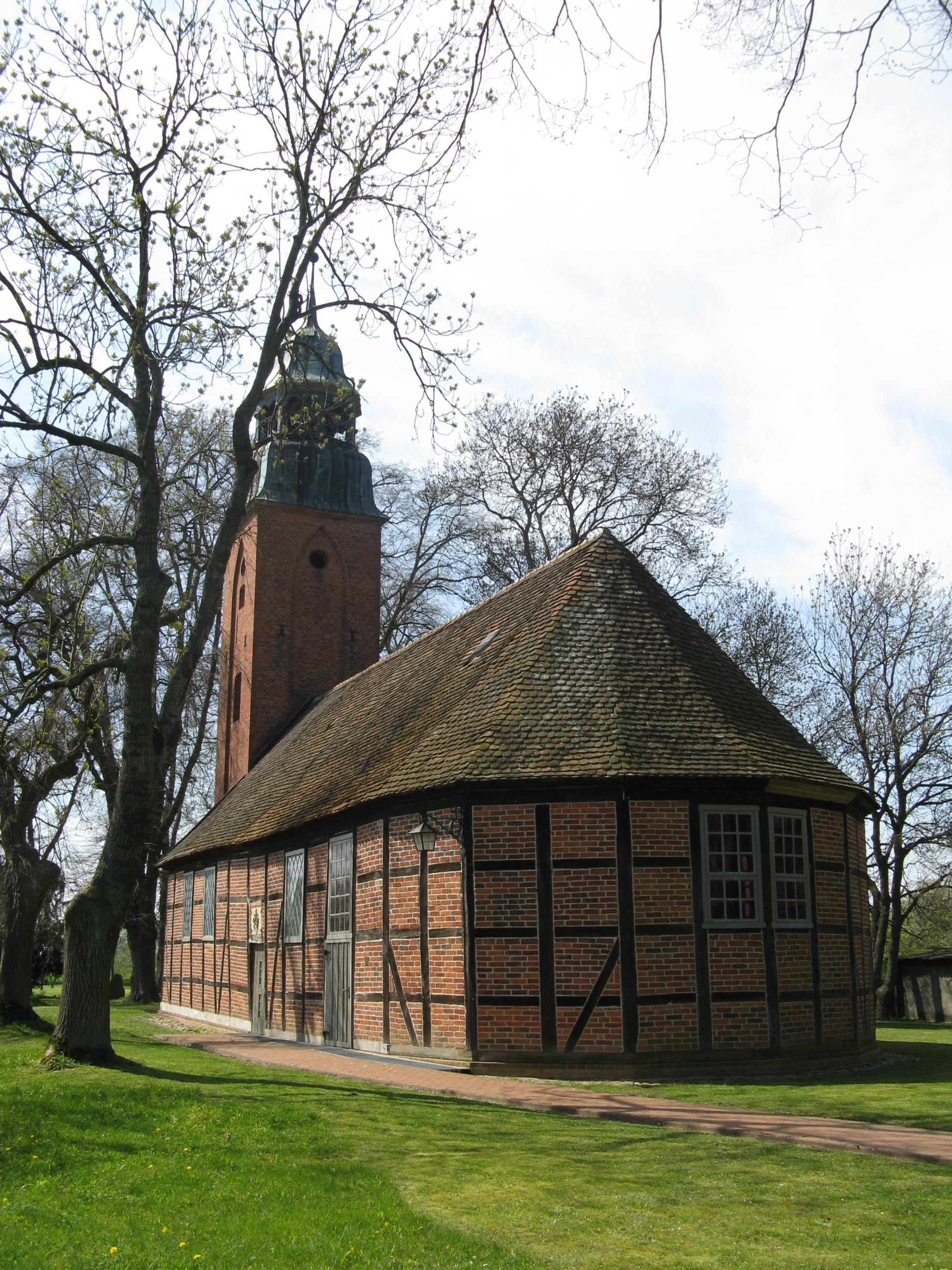
- Church in Möllenbeck

- Location of Möllenbeck within Ludwigslust-Parchim district
- Interactive map of Möllenbeck
- Location within Germany Location within Mecklenburg-Vorpommern
- Coordinates: 53°16′N 11°43′E
- Country: Germany
- State: Mecklenburg-Vorpommern
- District: Ludwigslust-Parchim
- Municipal assoc.: Grabow
- Subdivisions: 4

Government
  - Mayor: Wolfgang Gawron

Area
  - Total: 19.20 km^{2} (7.41 sq mi)
- Elevation: 35 m (115 ft)

Population (2025-12-31)
  - Total: 189
  - Density: 9.84/km^{2} (25.5/sq mi)
- Time zone: UTC+01:00 (CET)
  - Summer (DST): UTC+02:00 (CEST)
- Postal codes: 19300
- Dialling codes: 038721, 038752
- Vehicle registration: LWL
- Website: www.amt-grabow.de

Möllenbeck is a municipality in the Ludwigslust-Parchim district, in Mecklenburg-Vorpommern, Germany.

== Geography and transport links ==
Möllenbeck lies in southwestern Mecklenburg-Vorpommern between the rivers Tarnitz and Löcknitz. The Löcknitz-Mühlbach flows through the municipality. The nearest town is Grabow, where there is a motorway junction and from where the Bundesstraße 5 federal road may be accessed. The motorway junction to the A 24 (Parchim) is twelve kilometres to the east.

The villages of Menzendorf, Carlshof and Horst belong to the parish of Möllenbeck.
