= Nausdorf Canal =

Canal in Brandenburg, Germany

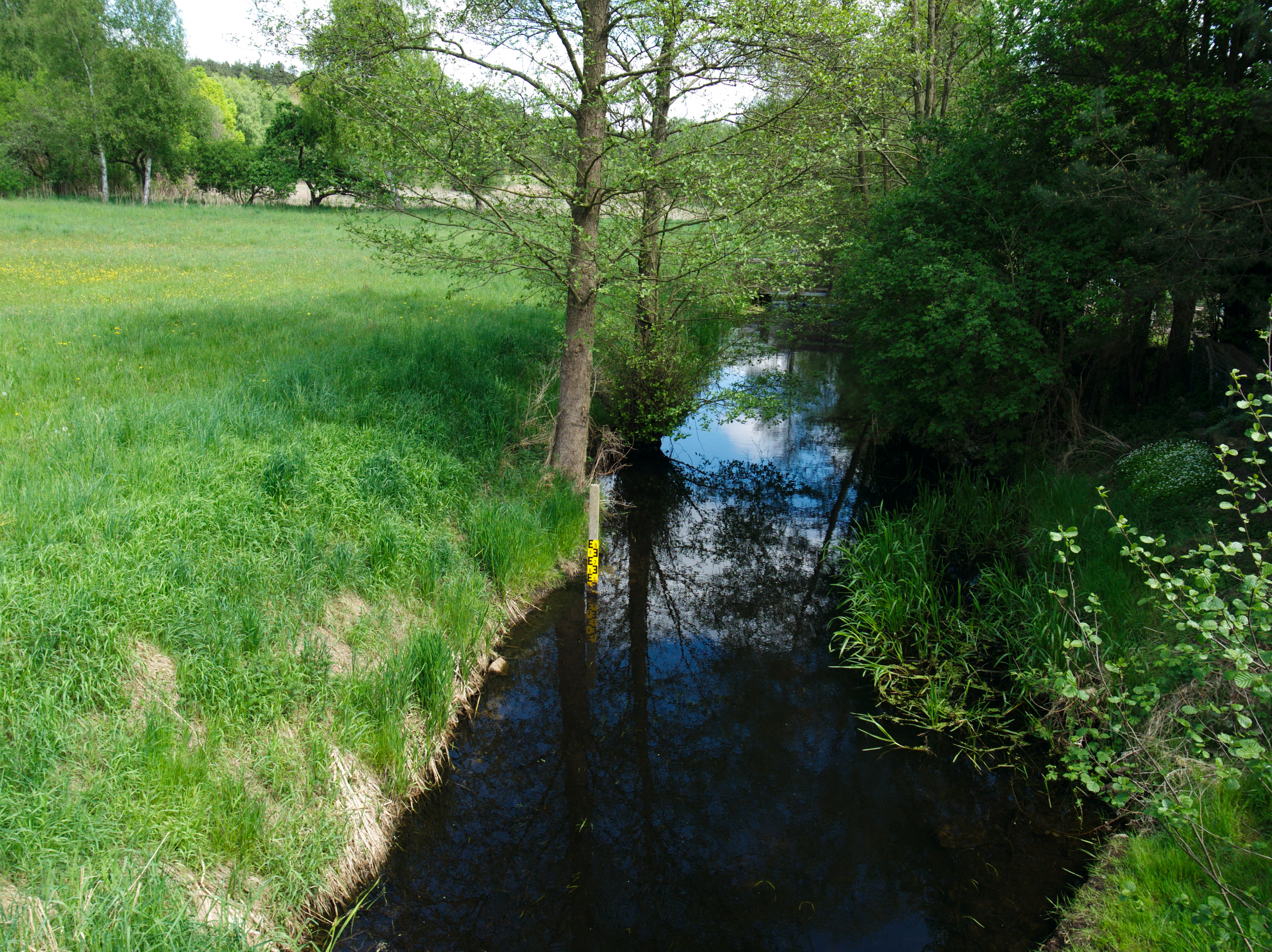
- Nausdorfer Kanal at Nausdorf

- Location within Brandenburg Location within Germany
- Location: Lenzen (Elbe) and Karstädt, Brandenburg
- Country: Germany
- Coordinates: 53°07′31″N 11°33′01″E

Specifications
- Length: 5 km (3.1 miles)
- Maximum boat beam: 3 m (9 ft 10 in) (originally 8 m or 26 ft 3 in)
- Maximum height AMSL: 17 m (56 ft)

History
- Date completed: 1879
- Date extended: 1925

Geography
- Start point: Rambower See
- End point: Rudower See

The Nausdorf Canal (German: Nausdorfer Kanal) is a canal in the municipalities of Lenzen and Karstädt in the northwest of Brandenburg, Germany. It links two lakes — the Rambower See, in Karstädt, and the Rudower See, in Lenzen — and runs through the Rambower Moor. It takes its name from the village of Nausdorf, part of Lenzen, located midway along the canal.

Already in the 15th century, there was a mill stream that powered a mill in Nausdorf that existed until 1833. The canal was built between 1862 and 1879, and expanded in 1924/1925 to its present dimensions.

The canal is about 5 kilometres (3.1 mi) long and was designed with a width of 8–10 metres (26–33 ft); today at points it is a maximum of 3 metres (9.8 ft) wide. Its depth is about 1 metre (3 ft 3 in); its bed is covered with a thick layer of mud. The watercourse is not navigable. It is popular with anglers due to its large stock of whitefish.
