= Grabow (Amt) =

Collective municipality in Ludwigslust-Parchim, Mecklenburg-Vorpommern, Germany

- Amt
- Map of Ludwigslust-Parchim highlighting Grabow
- Interactive map of Grabow
- Location within Germany Location within Mecklenburg-Vorpommern
- Coordinates: 53°15′N 11°35′E
- Country: Germany
- State: Mecklenburg-Vorpommern
- District: Ludwigslust-Parchim
- Seat: Boizenburg
- Subdivisions: 13 municipalities

Area
  - Total: 361.15 km^{2} (139.44 sq mi)

Population (2025-12-31)
  - Total: 10,583
  - Density: 29.304/km^{2} (75.896/sq mi)
- Time zone: UTC+01:00 (CET)
  - Summer (DST): UTC+02:00 (CEST)
- Website: www.grabow.de

Grabow is an Amt in the Ludwigslust-Parchim district, in Mecklenburg-Vorpommern, Germany. Its seat is in the town of Grabow.

The Amt Grabow borders the state of Brandenburg and is a part of the Hamburg Metropolitan Region. Its area is 361.15 square kilometres (139.44 sq mi) inhabited by a population of almost 11,000, resulting in a population density of 30 per square kilometer. It was founded on 1 January 2005 as a merger of the Amt Grabow-Land and the independent town of Grabow. On 1 January 2016, Grabow annexed the municipality Steesow, resulting in the Amt losing one member. The Amt Grabow publishes a monthly Amtsblatt called Grabower Amtsanzeiger which, besides informing about administrative decisions, also writes about including events, associations, schools, and other things in the Amt. It is also available as a free PDF on the official website.

It consists of the following municipalities:

1. Balow
2. Brunow
3. Dambeck
4. Eldena
5. Gorlosen
6. Grabow (seat)
7. Karstädt
8. Kremmin
9. Milow
10. Möllenbeck
11. Muchow
12. Prislich
13. Zierzow
