= Karstädt, Mecklenburg-Vorpommern =

Karstädt
- Municipality
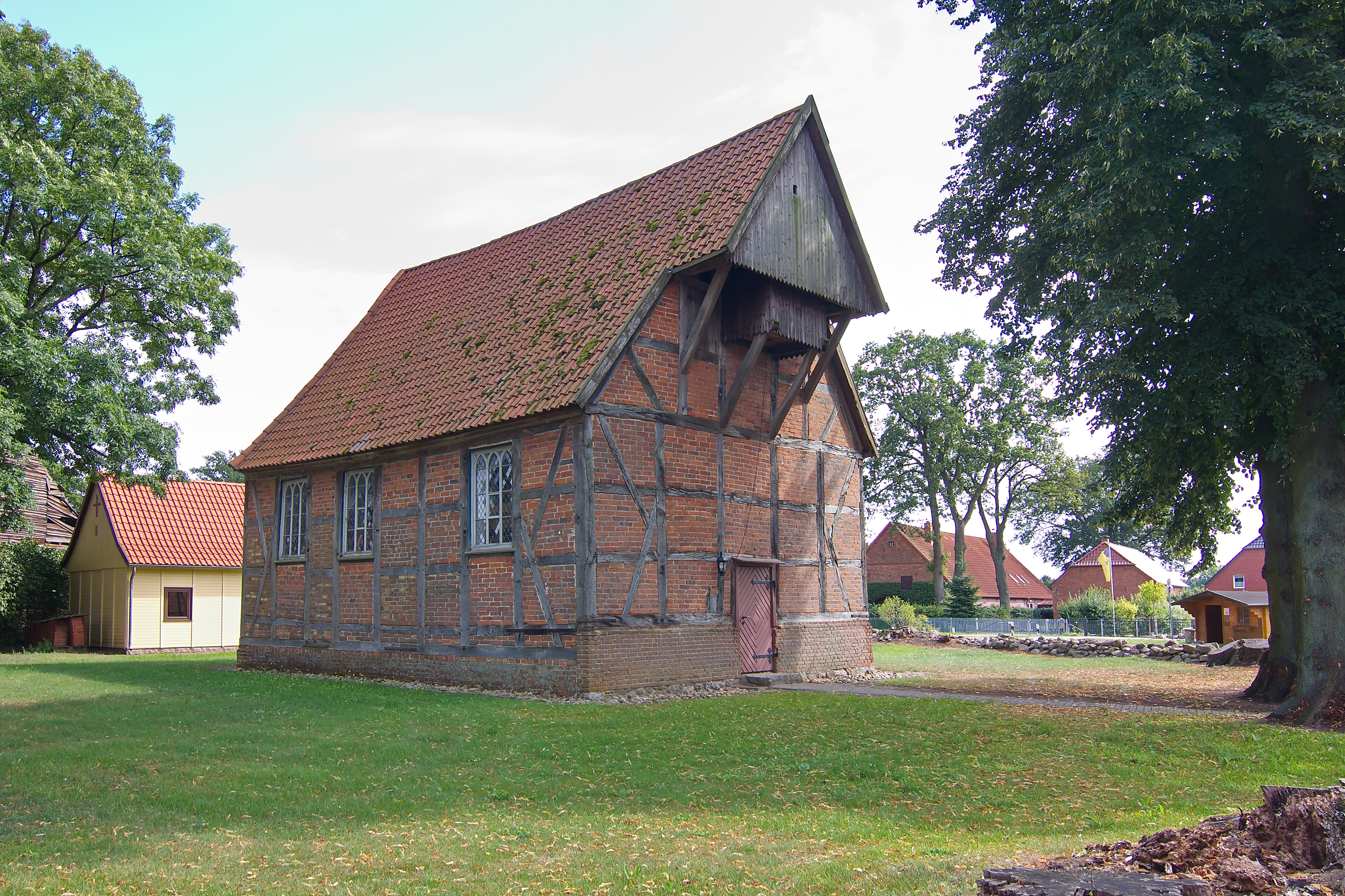
- Village church in Karstädt

- Coat of arms

- Location of Karstädt within Ludwigslust-Parchim district
- Interactive map of Karstädt
- Location within Germany Location within Mecklenburg-Vorpommern
- Coordinates: 53°16′N 11°28′E
- Country: Germany
- State: Mecklenburg-Vorpommern
- District: Ludwigslust-Parchim
- Municipal assoc.: Grabow
- Subdivisions: 2

Government
  - Mayor: Krimhilde Franck

Area
  - Total: 19.79 km^{2} (7.64 sq mi)
- Elevation: 25 m (82 ft)

Population (2025-12-31)
  - Total: 575
  - Density: 29.1/km^{2} (75.3/sq mi)
- Time zone: UTC+01:00 (CET)
  - Summer (DST): UTC+02:00 (CEST)
- Postal codes: 19294
- Dialling codes: 03874
- Vehicle registration: LWL
- Website: www.amt-grabow.de

Karstädt (German pronunciation: [ˈkaʁʃtɛt]) is a municipality in the Ludwigslust-Parchim district, in Mecklenburg-Vorpommern, Germany.
