= Brunow =

- Municipality
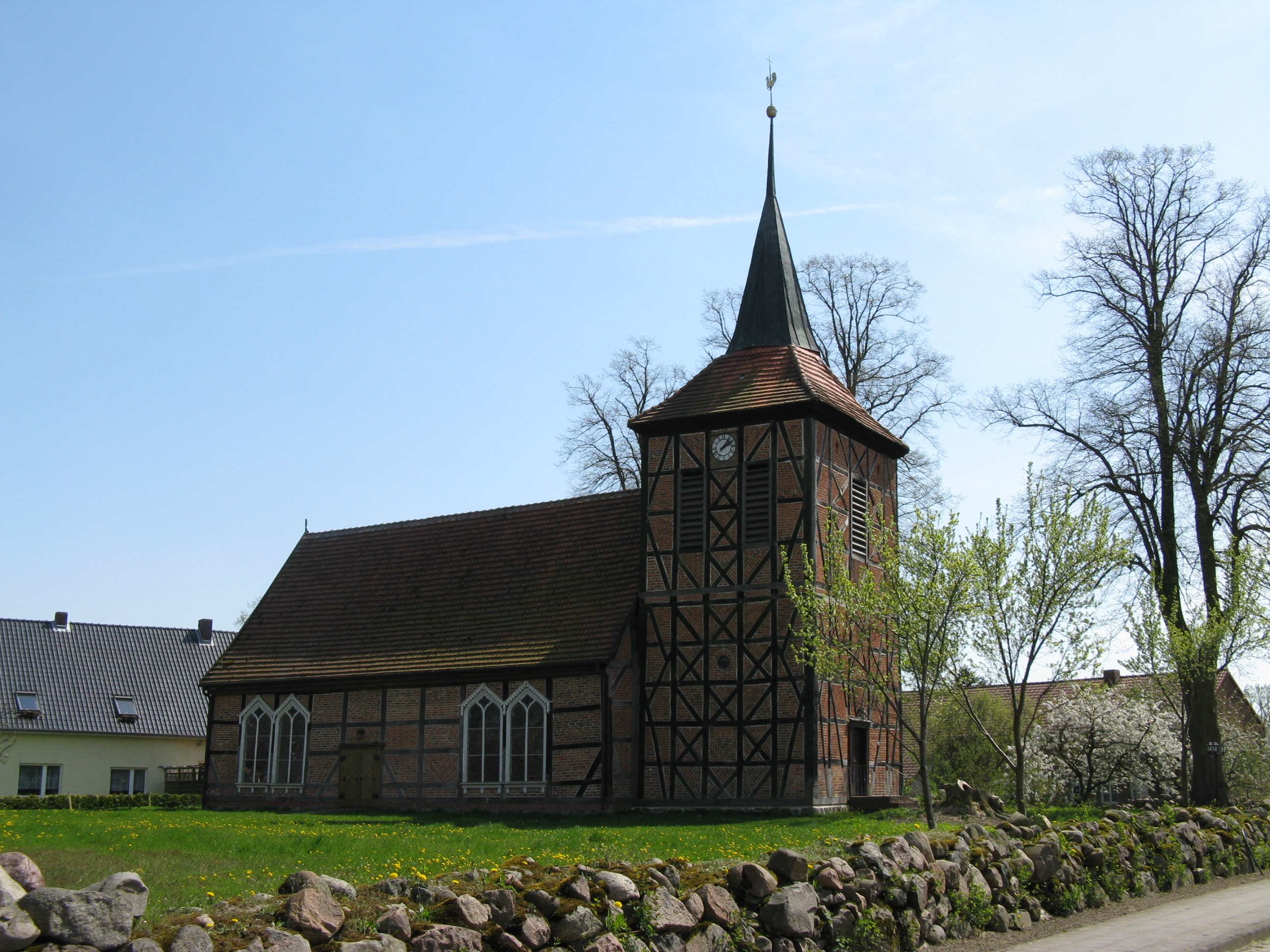
- Village church in Brunow

- Location of Brunow within Ludwigslust-Parchim district
- Interactive map of Brunow
- Location within Germany Location within Mecklenburg-Vorpommern
- Coordinates: 53°16′N 11°48′E
- Country: Germany
- State: Mecklenburg-Vorpommern
- District: Ludwigslust-Parchim
- Municipal assoc.: Grabow
- Subdivisions: 4

Government
  - Mayor: Heike Bartczak

Area
  - Total: 21.09 km^{2} (8.14 sq mi)
- Elevation: 35 m (115 ft)

Population (2025-12-31)
  - Total: 298
  - Density: 14.1/km^{2} (36.6/sq mi)
- Time zone: UTC+01:00 (CET)
  - Summer (DST): UTC+02:00 (CEST)
- Postal codes: 19372
- Dialling codes: 038721
- Vehicle registration: LWL
- Website: www.amt-grabow.de

For places in Poland, see Brunów (disambiguation).

Brunow is a municipality in the Ludwigslust-Parchim district, in Mecklenburg-Vorpommern, Germany.
