= Balow =

- Municipality
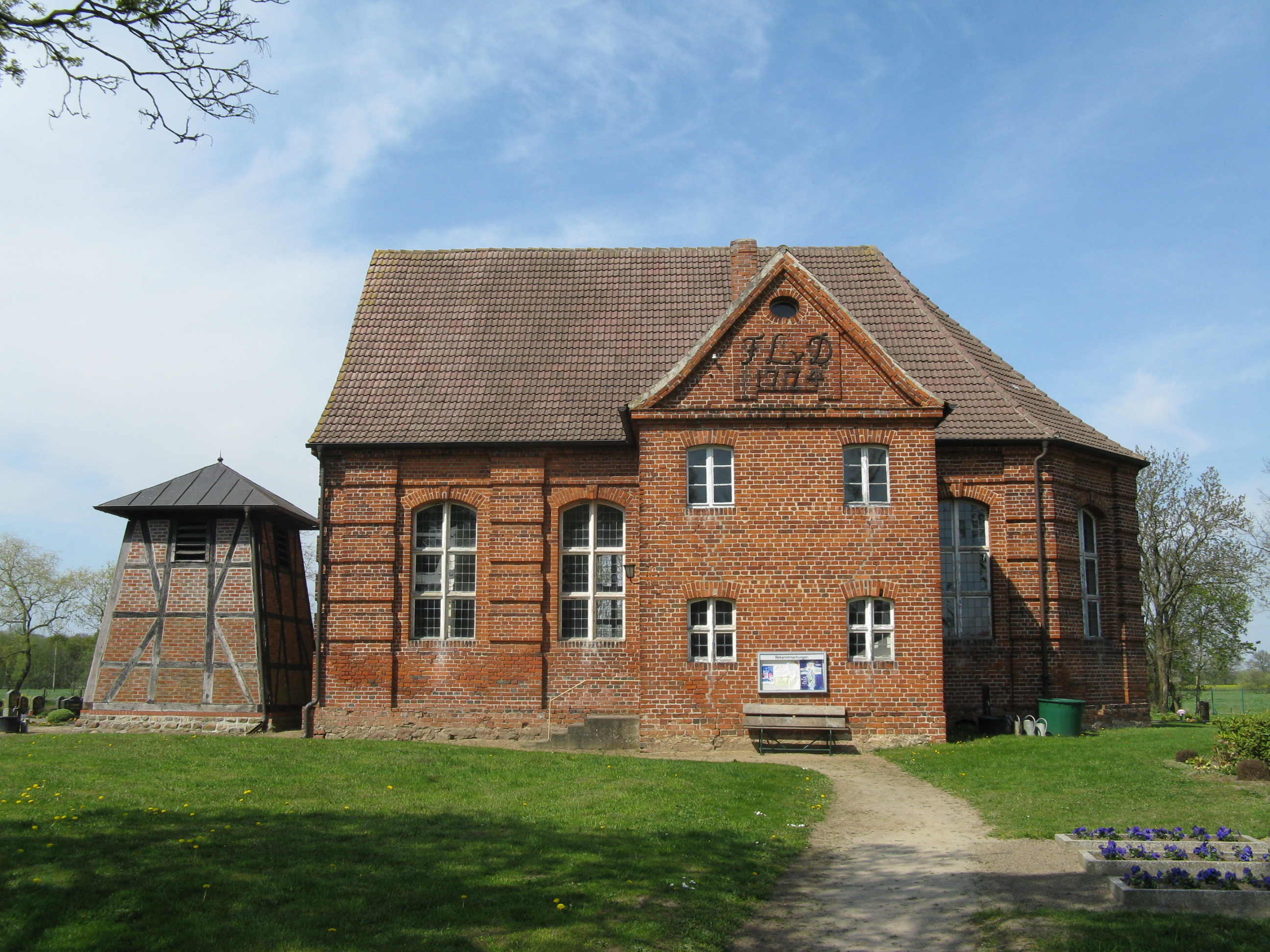
- Balow village church

- Location of Balow within Ludwigslust-Parchim district
- Interactive map of Balow
- Location within Germany Location within Mecklenburg-Vorpommern
- Coordinates: 53°16′N 11°43′E
- Country: Germany
- State: Mecklenburg-Vorpommern
- District: Ludwigslust-Parchim
- Municipal assoc.: Grabow

Government
  - Mayor: Krimhild Kant

Area
  - Total: 12.83 km^{2} (4.95 sq mi)
- Elevation: 33 m (108 ft)

Population (2025-12-31)
  - Total: 312
  - Density: 24.3/km^{2} (63.0/sq mi)
- Time zone: UTC+01:00 (CET)
  - Summer (DST): UTC+02:00 (CEST)
- Postal codes: 19300
- Dialling codes: 038752
- Vehicle registration: LUP, HGN, LBZ, LWL, PCH, STB
- Website: www.amt-grabow.de

Balow is a municipality in the Ludwigslust-Parchim district, in Mecklenburg-Vorpommern, Germany.

Balow was developed as an East German model village, and is known for its community sports programs. A machine shop in Balow produces transport boxes for the assembly lines of large companies, including Daimler Benz.
