= Brunów =

Brunów may refer to the following places in Poland:

- Brunów, Lwówek County
- Brunów, Polkowice County

== See also ==
- Brunow, Germany
- Heckelberg-Brunow, Germany
- 16590 Brunowalter, an asteroid
