= Zierzow =

- Municipality
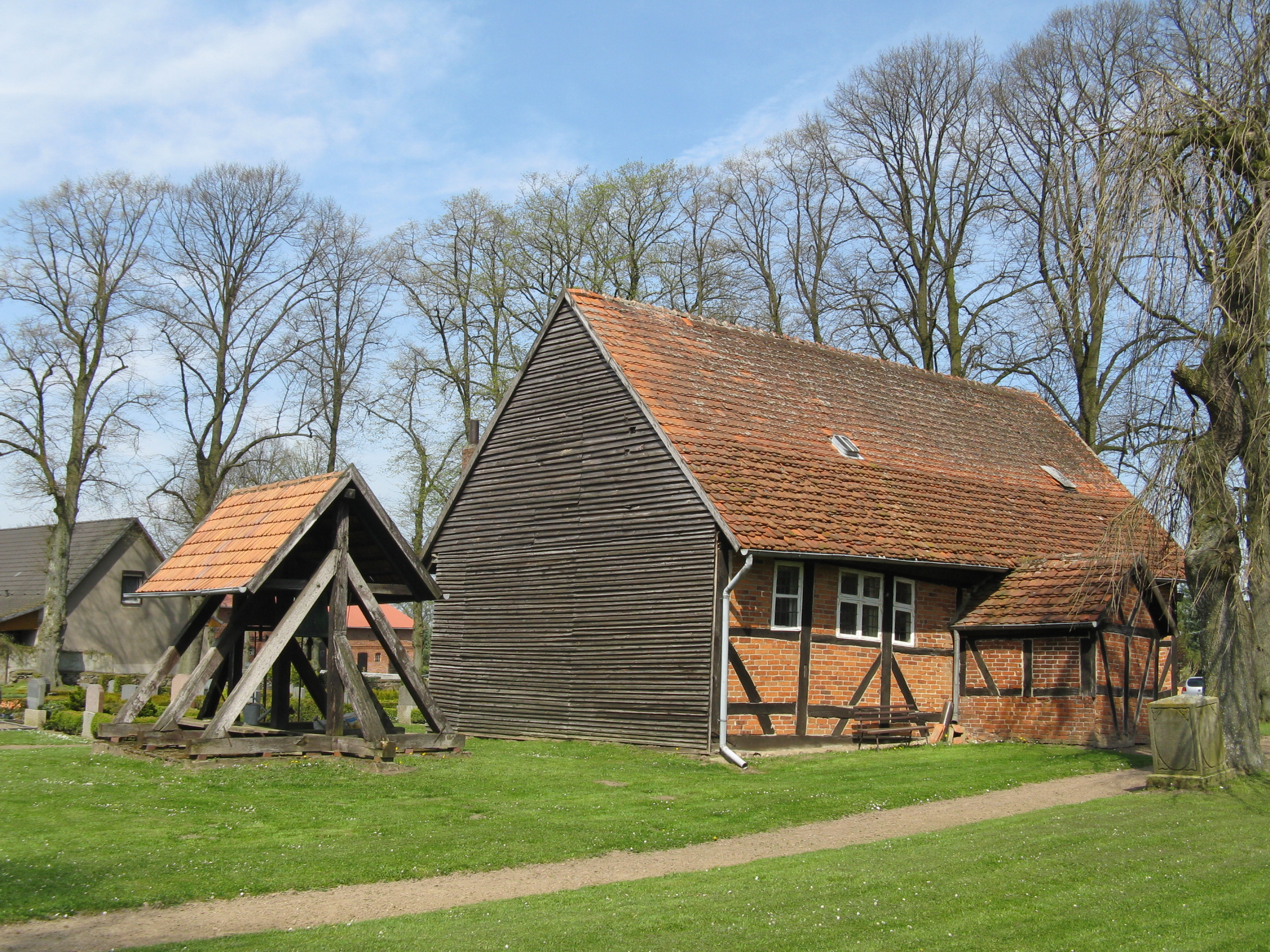
- Zierzow Church

- Location of Zierzow within Ludwigslust-Parchim district
- Interactive map of Zierzow
- Location within Germany Location within Mecklenburg-Vorpommern
- Coordinates: 53°16′N 11°40′E
- Country: Germany
- State: Mecklenburg-Vorpommern
- District: Ludwigslust-Parchim
- Municipal assoc.: Grabow
- Subdivisions: 2

Government
  - Mayor: Cornelia Wiedow

Area
  - Total: 13.33 km^{2} (5.15 sq mi)
- Elevation: 35 m (115 ft)

Population (2025-12-31)
  - Total: 400
  - Density: 30/km^{2} (78/sq mi)
- Time zone: UTC+01:00 (CET)
  - Summer (DST): UTC+02:00 (CEST)
- Postal codes: 19300
- Dialling codes: 038752
- Vehicle registration: LWL
- Website: www.amt-grabow.de

Zierzow (German pronunciation: [ˈtsiːɐ̯tsoː]) is a municipality in the Ludwigslust-Parchim district, in Mecklenburg-Vorpommern, Germany.
