= Kremmin =

- Municipality
- Location of Kremmin within Ludwigslust-Parchim district
- Interactive map of Kremmin
- Location within Germany Location within Mecklenburg-Vorpommern
- Coordinates: 53°15′N 11°35′E
- Country: Germany
- State: Mecklenburg-Vorpommern
- District: Ludwigslust-Parchim
- Municipal assoc.: Grabow
- Subdivisions: 2

Government
  - Mayor: Martin Pinzer

Area
  - Total: 16.86 km^{2} (6.51 sq mi)
- Elevation: 36 m (118 ft)

Population (2025-12-31)
  - Total: 239
  - Density: 14.2/km^{2} (36.7/sq mi)
- Time zone: UTC+01:00 (CET)
  - Summer (DST): UTC+02:00 (CEST)
- Postal codes: 19300
- Dialling codes: 038756
- Vehicle registration: LWL
- Website: www.amt-grabow.de

Kremmin is a municipality in the Ludwigslust-Parchim district, in Mecklenburg-Vorpommern, Germany.
