= Eldena =

- Municipality
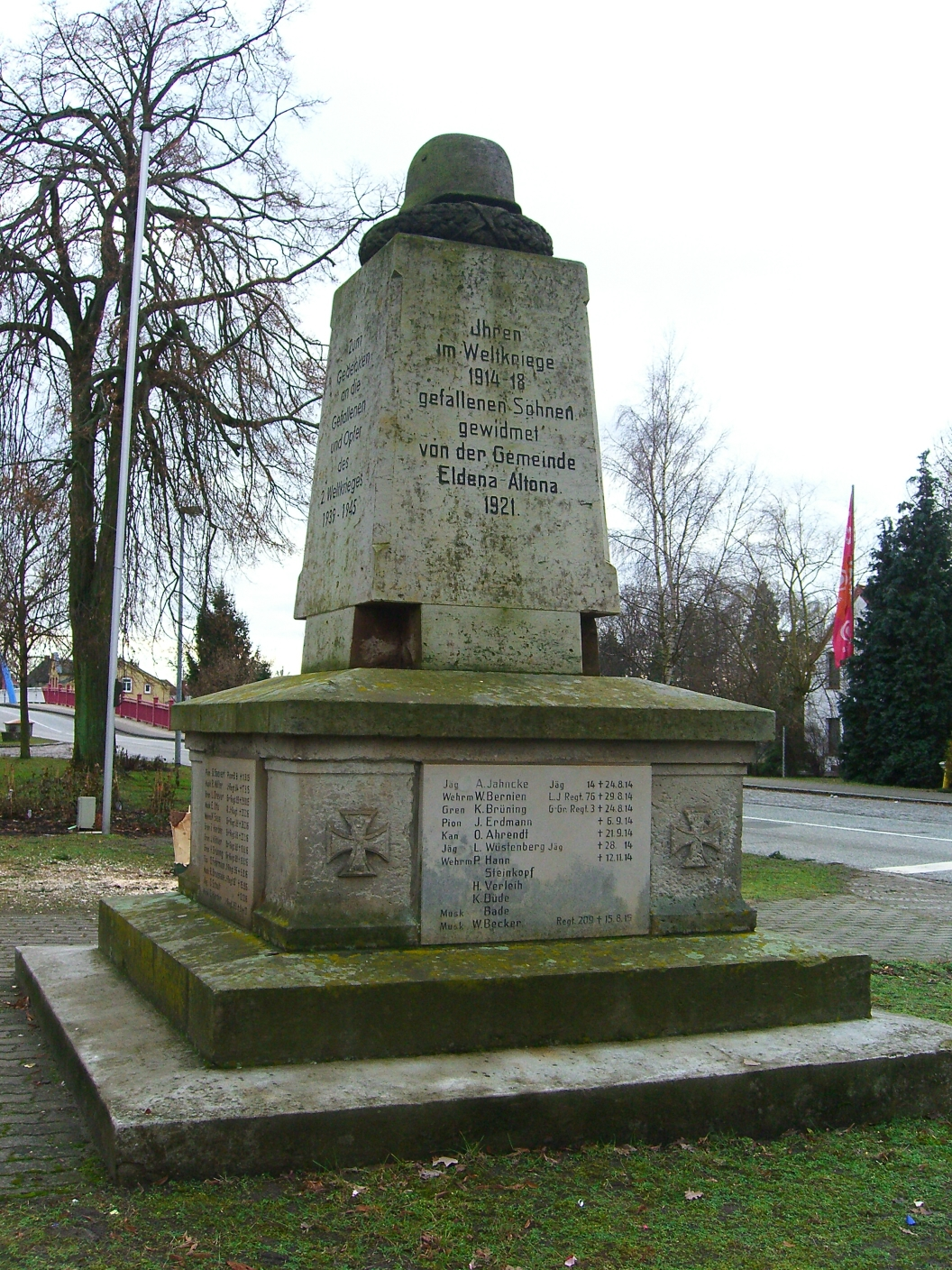
- War memorial in Eldena

- Coat of arms

- Location of Eldena within Ludwigslust-Parchim district
- Interactive map of Eldena
- Location within Germany Location within Mecklenburg-Vorpommern
- Coordinates: 53°13′N 11°25′E
- Country: Germany
- State: Mecklenburg-Vorpommern
- District: Ludwigslust-Parchim
- Municipal assoc.: Grabow
- Subdivisions: 5

Government
  - Mayor: Reinhard Tiede

Area
  - Total: 33.98 km^{2} (13.12 sq mi)
- Elevation: 21 m (69 ft)

Population (2025-12-31)
  - Total: 1,146
  - Density: 33.73/km^{2} (87.35/sq mi)
- Time zone: UTC+01:00 (CET)
  - Summer (DST): UTC+02:00 (CEST)
- Postal codes: 19294
- Dialling codes: 038755
- Vehicle registration: LWL
- Website: www.amt-grabow.de

Eldena is a municipality in the Ludwigslust-Parchim district, in Mecklenburg-Vorpommern, Germany.
