= Lenzen (Elbe) =

- Town
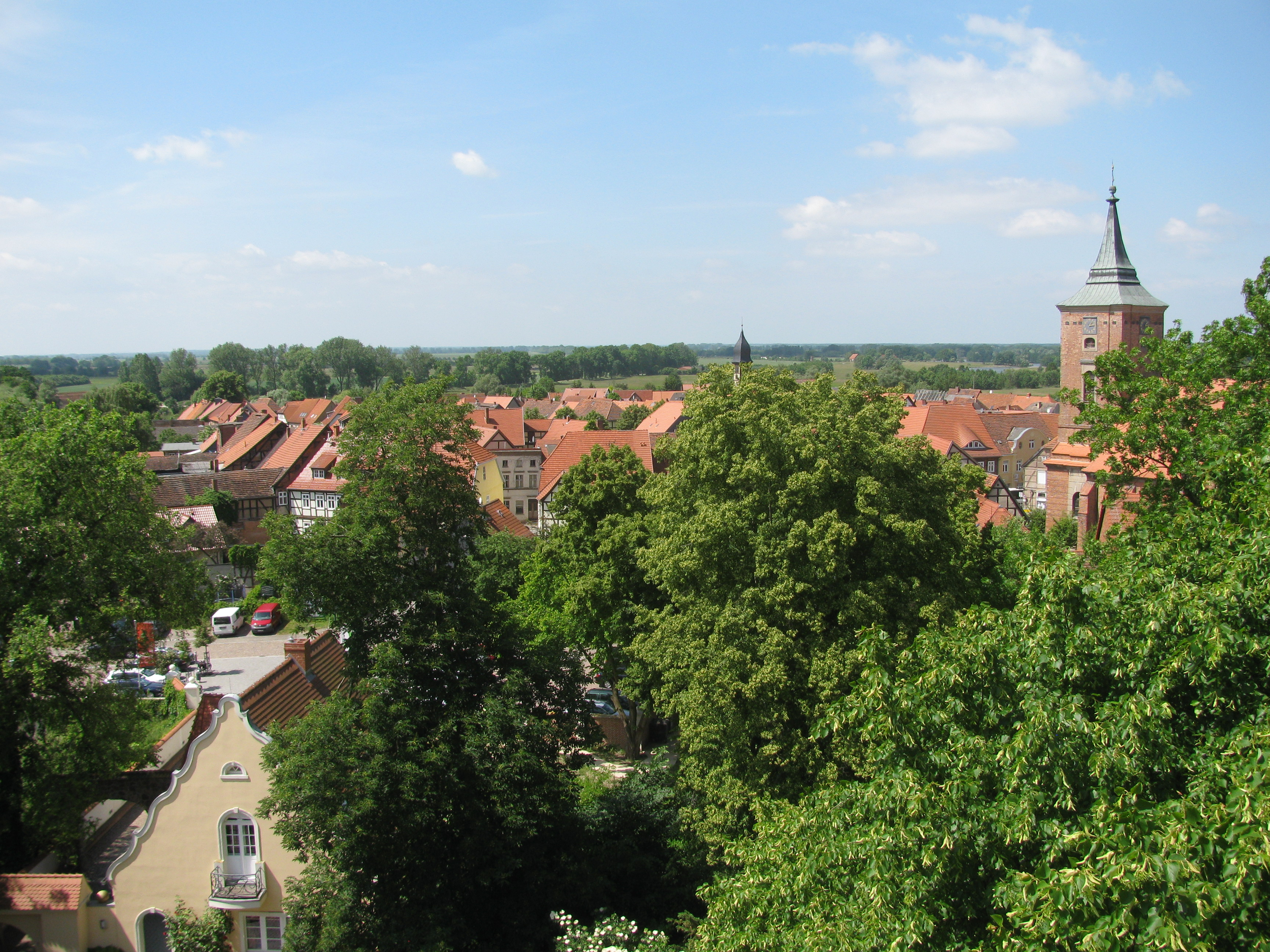

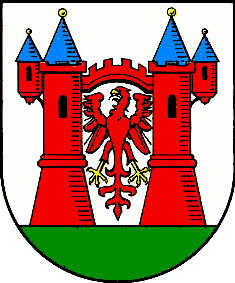
- Coat of arms

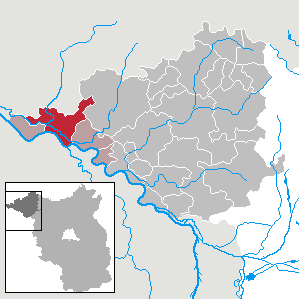
- Location of Lenzen within Prignitz district
- Interactive map of Lenzen
- Location within Germany Location within Brandenburg
- Coordinates: 53°05′28″N 11°28′24″E
- Country: Germany
- State: Brandenburg
- District: Prignitz
- Municipal assoc.: Lenzen-Elbtalaue
- Subdivisions: 9 Ortsteile

Government
  - Mayor (2024–29): Walter Jahnke

Area
  - Total: 96.19 km^{2} (37.14 sq mi)
- Elevation: 19 m (62 ft)

Population (2025-12-31)
  - Total: 2,000
  - Density: 21/km^{2} (54/sq mi)
- Time zone: UTC+01:00 (CET)
  - Summer (DST): UTC+02:00 (CEST)
- Postal codes: 19309
- Dialling codes: 038792
- Vehicle registration: PR
- Website: www.lenzenelbe.de

Lenzen (Elbe) (German pronunciation: [ˈlɛntsn̩]) is a small town in the district of Prignitz, in Brandenburg, northern Germany. The town lies to the north of the Löcknitz River, not far from where the Löcknitz flows into the Elbe. It is part of the Amt Lenzen-Elbtalaue.

== Overview ==
Lenzen is situated near the Elbe, approximately 20 km northwest of Wittenberge. It was the scene of the Battle of Lenzen, an early victory by the Germans over the Wends in 929.

Frederick, Count of Zollern, confiscated it from the von Quitzow family in 1420 for their part in the uprising of the Wendish nobility, and mortgaged it to Otto von Blumenthal. He redeemed the mortgage and restored the von Quitzows in 1422.

Another Lenzen is an Old Prussian site in (former) East-Prussia near the Baltic Sea.

== Demography ==
Development of Population since 1875 within the Current Boundaries (Blue Line: Population; Dotted Line: Comparison to Population Development of Brandenburg state; Grey Background: Time of Nazi rule; Red Background: Time of Communist rule)

Lenzen (Elbe): Population development
within the current boundaries (2013)

| Year | Pop. | ±% p.a. |
|---|---|---|
| 1875 | 4,619 | — |
| 1890 | 4,403 | −0.32% |
| 1910 | 4,065 | −0.40% |
| 1925 | 4,167 | +0.17% |
| 1933 | 4,069 | −0.30% |
| 1939 | 3,980 | −0.37% |
| 1946 | 5,309 | +4.20% |
| 1950 | 5,389 | +0.37% |
| 1964 | 4,258 | −1.67% |
| 1971 | 4,038 | −0.75% |
| 1981 | 3,503 | −1.41% |
| 1985 | 3,390 | −0.82% |
| 1989 | 3,293 | −0.72% |
| 1990 | 3,255 | −1.15% |
| 1991 | 3,100 | −4.76% |
| 1992 | 3,133 | +1.06% |
| 1993 | 3,084 | −1.56% |
| 1994 | 3,067 | −0.55% |
| 1995 | 3,008 | −1.92% |
| 1996 | 2,985 | −0.76% |

| Year | Pop. | ±% p.a. |
|---|---|---|
| 1997 | 2,986 | +0.03% |
| 1998 | 2,926 | −2.01% |
| 1999 | 2,916 | −0.34% |
| 2000 | 2,830 | −2.95% |
| 2001 | 2,766 | −2.26% |
| 2002 | 2,750 | −0.58% |
| 2003 | 2,707 | −1.56% |
| 2004 | 2,661 | −1.70% |
| 2005 | 2,622 | −1.47% |
| 2006 | 2,554 | −2.59% |
| 2007 | 2,519 | −1.37% |
| 2008 | 2,453 | −2.62% |
| 2009 | 2,381 | −2.94% |
| 2010 | 2,363 | −0.76% |
| 2011 | 2,319 | −1.86% |
| 2012 | 2,293 | −1.12% |
| 2013 | 2,251 | −1.83% |
| 2014 | 2,209 | −1.87% |
| 2015 | 2,219 | +0.45% |
| 2016 | 2,160 | −2.66% |

== Photogallery ==
Historic view of Lenzen on a Notgeld bill from 1922 issues in Lenzen (http://www.germannotes.com)

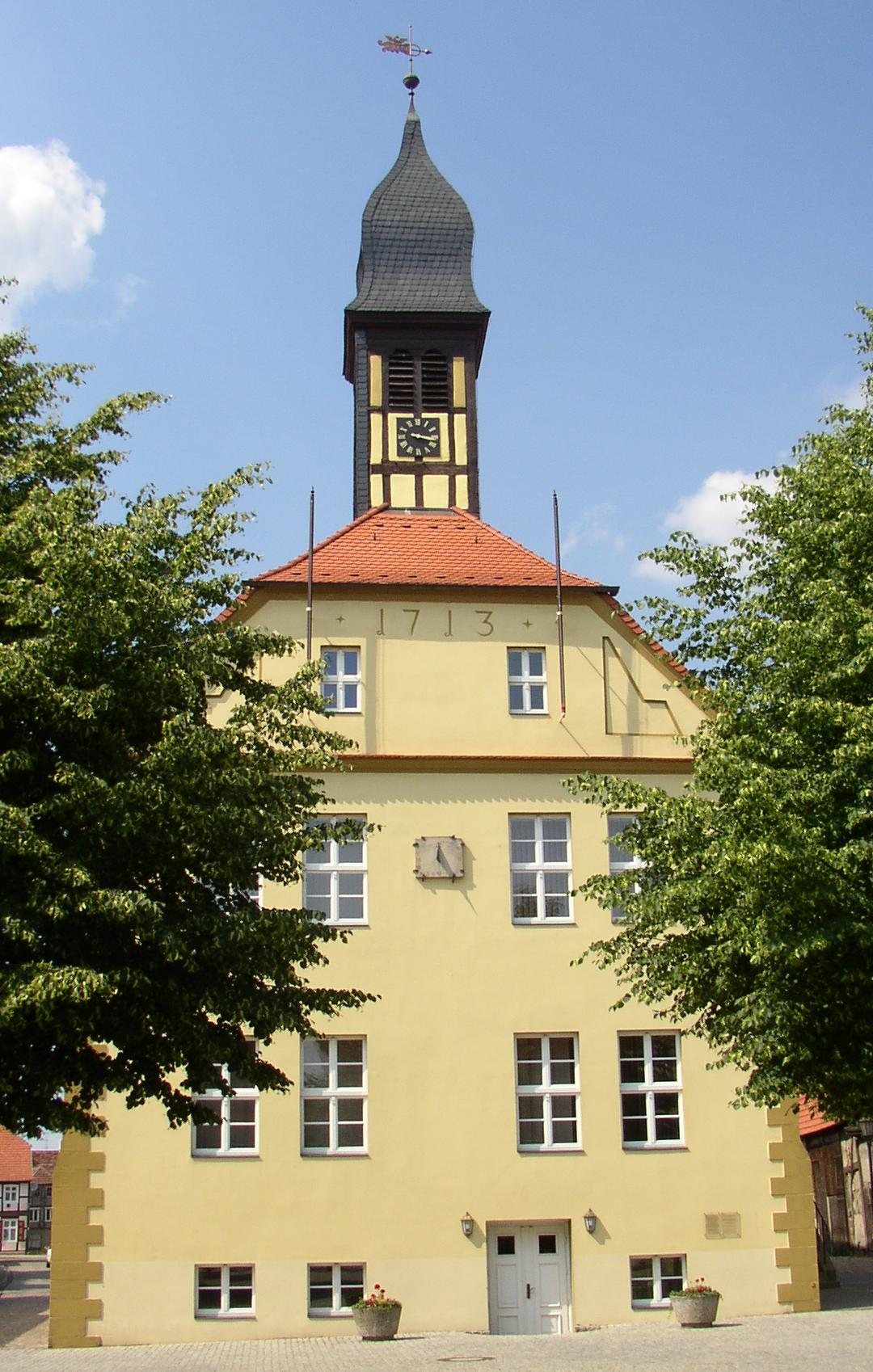
Town hall

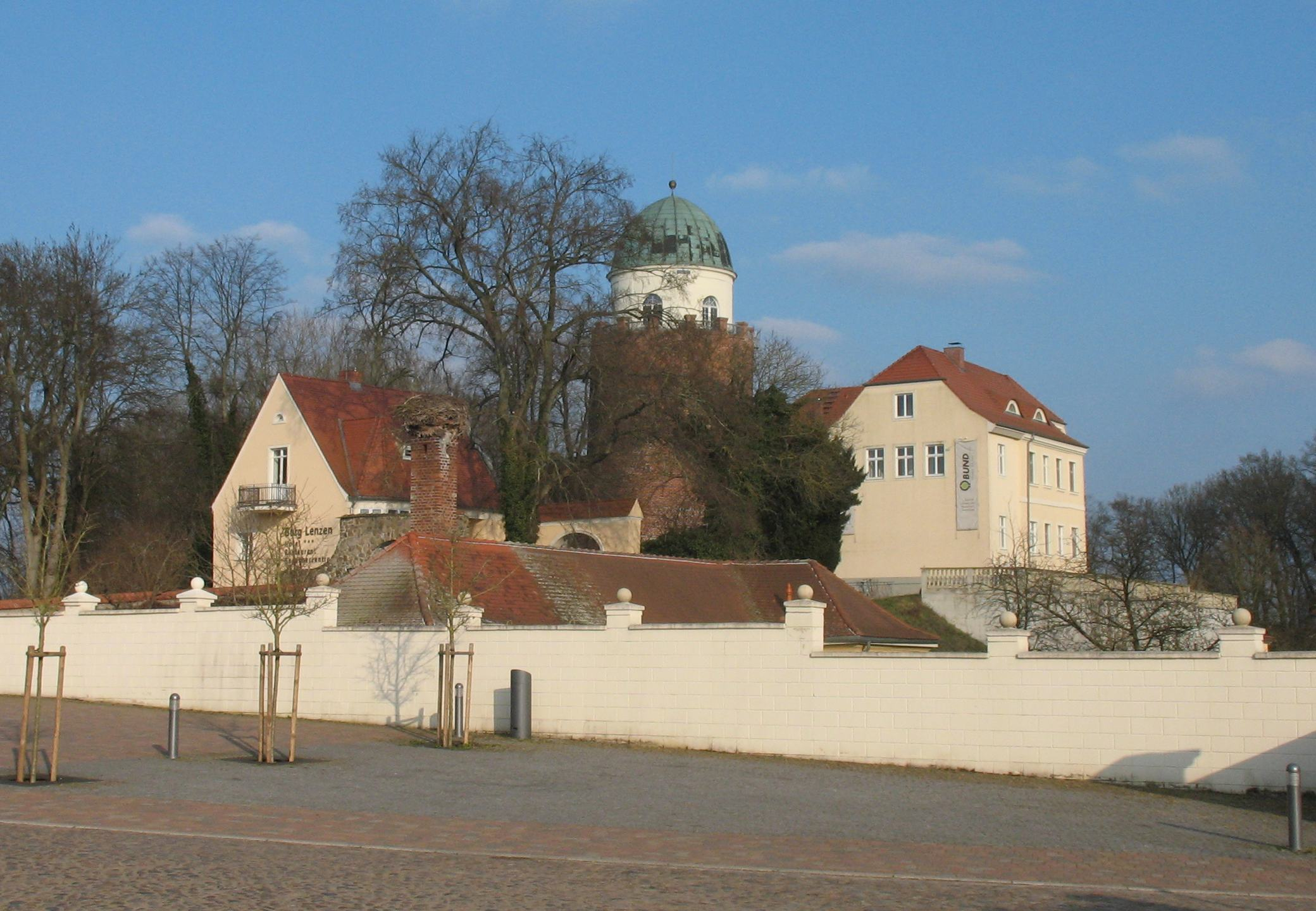
Castle

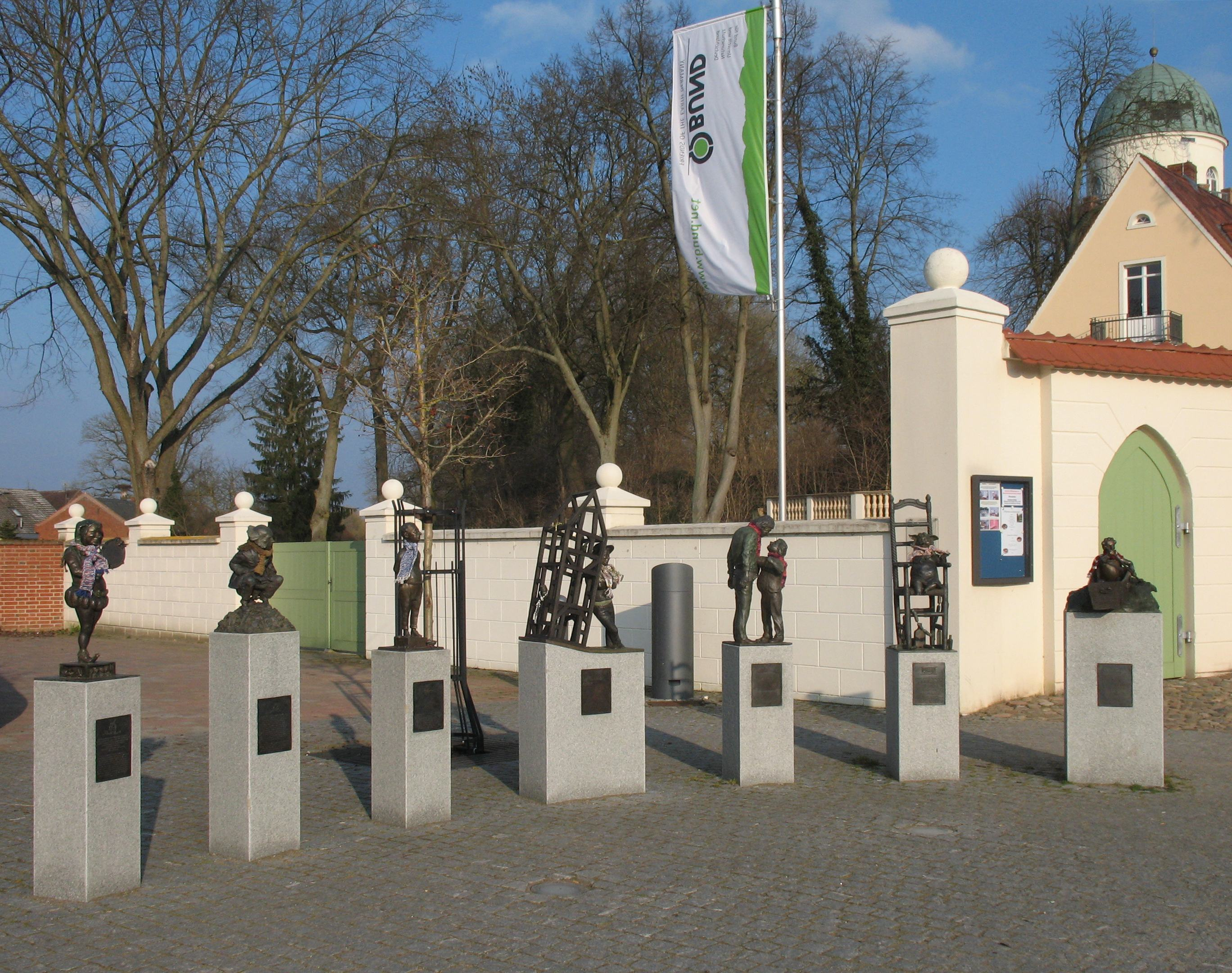
"Jester's licence"

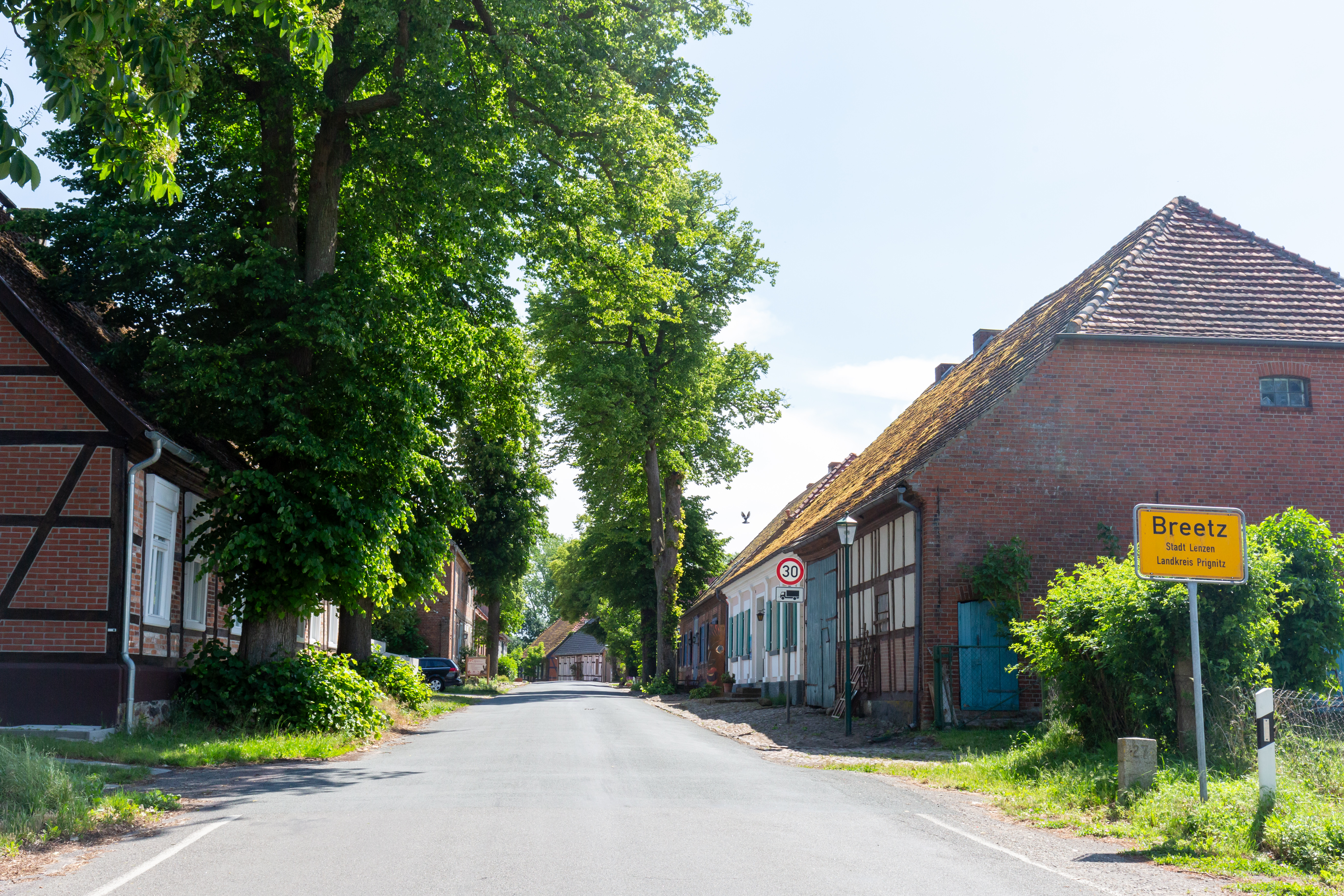
Breetz

== See also ==
- Nausdorf Canal
- Battle of Lenzen (929 AD)
