= Prislich =

- Municipality
- Location of Prislich within Ludwigslust-Parchim district
- Interactive map of Prislich
- Location within Germany Location within Mecklenburg-Vorpommern
- Coordinates: 53°16′N 11°37′E
- Country: Germany
- State: Mecklenburg-Vorpommern
- District: Ludwigslust-Parchim
- Municipal assoc.: Grabow
- Subdivisions: 5

Government
  - Mayor: Günter Klink

Area
  - Total: 29.14 km^{2} (11.25 sq mi)
- Elevation: 38 m (125 ft)

Population (2025-12-31)
  - Total: 694
  - Density: 23.8/km^{2} (61.7/sq mi)
- Time zone: UTC+01:00 (CET)
  - Summer (DST): UTC+02:00 (CEST)
- Postal codes: 19300
- Dialling codes: 038752, 038756
- Vehicle registration: LWL
- Website: www.amt-grabow.de

Prislich is a municipality in the Ludwigslust-Parchim district, in Mecklenburg-Vorpommern, Germany.
