= Milow, Germany =

Municipality in Mecklenburg-Vorpommern, Germany

Milow
- Municipality
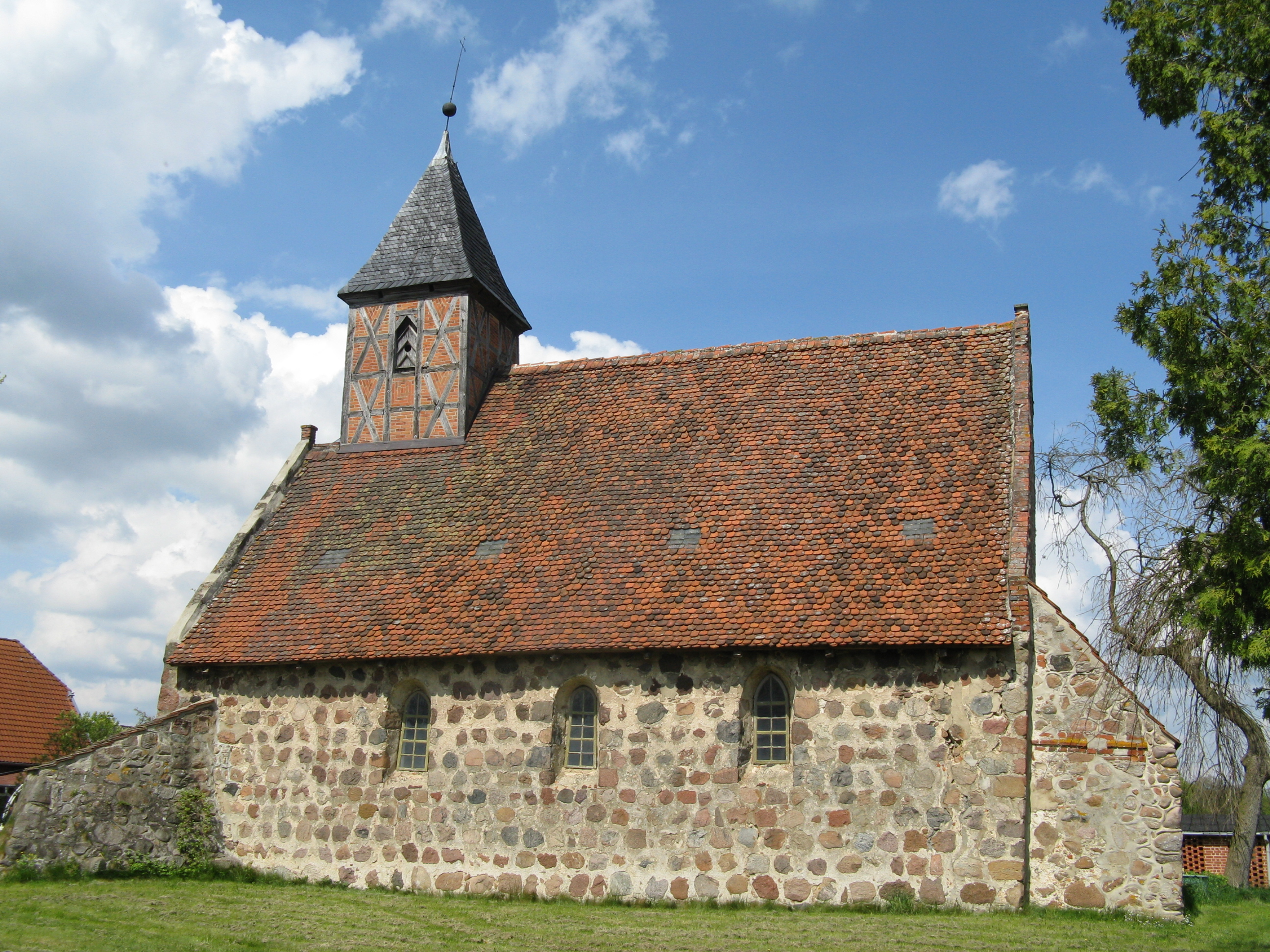
- Milow Church

- Location of Milow within Ludwigslust-Parchim district
- Interactive map of Milow
- Location within Germany Location within Mecklenburg-Vorpommern
- Coordinates: 53°11′48″N 11°32′12″E
- Country: Germany
- State: Mecklenburg-Vorpommern
- District: Ludwigslust-Parchim
- Municipal assoc.: Grabow
- Subdivisions: 6

Government
  - Mayor: Konrad Schmidt

Area
  - Total: 33.65 km^{2} (12.99 sq mi)
- Elevation: 35 m (115 ft)

Population (2025-12-31)
  - Total: 362
  - Density: 10.8/km^{2} (27.9/sq mi)
- Time zone: UTC+01:00 (CET)
  - Summer (DST): UTC+02:00 (CEST)
- Postal codes: 19300, 19294 (Krinitz)
- Dialling codes: 038781, 038755 (Krinitz)
- Vehicle registration: LUP, HGN, LBZ, LWL, PCH, STB

Milow (German pronunciation: [ˈmiːloː]) is a municipality in the Ludwigslust-Parchim district, in Mecklenburg-Vorpommern, Germany.
