= Löcknitz (river) =

River in Germany

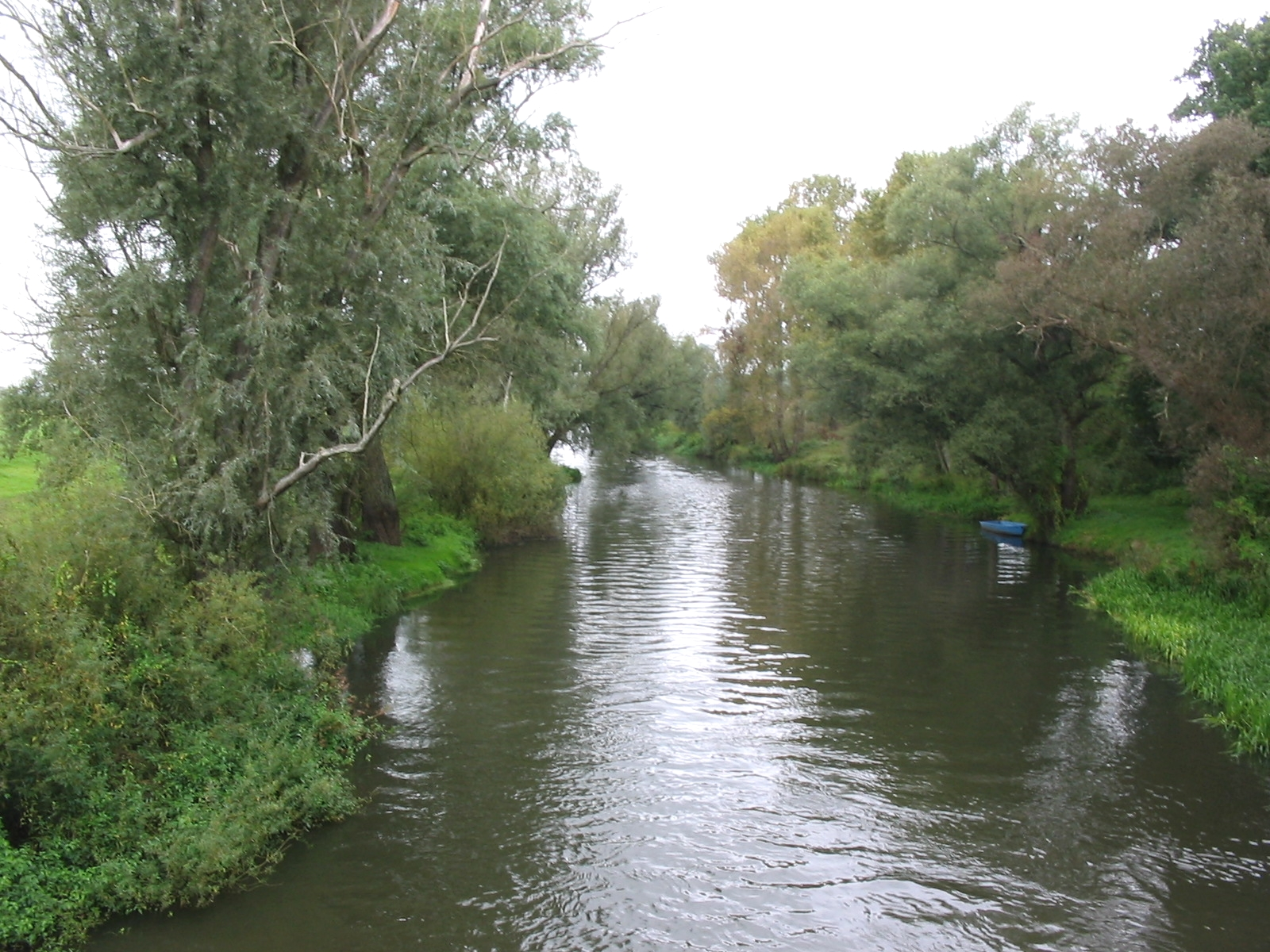
- The Löcknitz near Polz

Location
- Country: Germany
- States: Mecklenburg-Vorpommern; Brandenburg; Lower Saxony
- Districts: Ludwigslust-Parchim; Prignitz; Lüneburg

Physical characteristics
- Source
  - location: Ziegendorf at Parchim
  - coordinates: 53°18′35″N 11°49′55″E
  - elevation: ca. 53 m (174 ft)
- Mouth
  - location: near Wehningen into the Elbe
  - coordinates: 53°10′03″N 11°09′21″E
  - elevation: 11.5 m (38 ft)
- Length: 66 km (41 mi)
- Basin size: 937 km^{2} (362 sq mi)
- Discharge
  - average: 4.6 m^{3}/s (160 cu ft/s)

Basin features
- Progression: Elbe→ North Sea
- Tributaries
  - left: Karwe, Hauptgraben and others
  - right: Löcknitz-Mühlbach, Tarnitz, Alte Elde and others
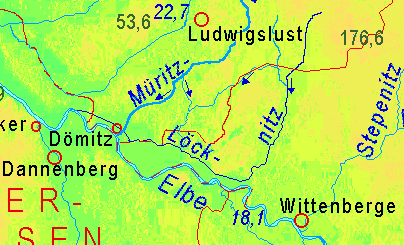

Löcknitz (German pronunciation: [ˈlœknɪts]) is a river in northern Germany (Mecklenburg-Vorpommern, Brandenburg and a few kilometres in Lower Saxony.

The Löcknitz is a right tributary of the Elbe, its total length is 66 kilometres (41 mi). The Löcknitz originates south of Parchim, and flows through Karstädt, Lenzen, and Dömitz. The Löcknitz joins the Elbe in Wehningen (part of Amt Neuhaus), a few kilometres downstream from Dömitz.

A different river Löcknitz arises in a protected valley in Eastern Brandenburg, contributing to Spree and then into Havel and Elbe as well.

== See also ==
- List of rivers of Mecklenburg-Vorpommern
- List of rivers of Brandenburg
- List of rivers of Lower Saxony
