= Karstädt =

- Municipality
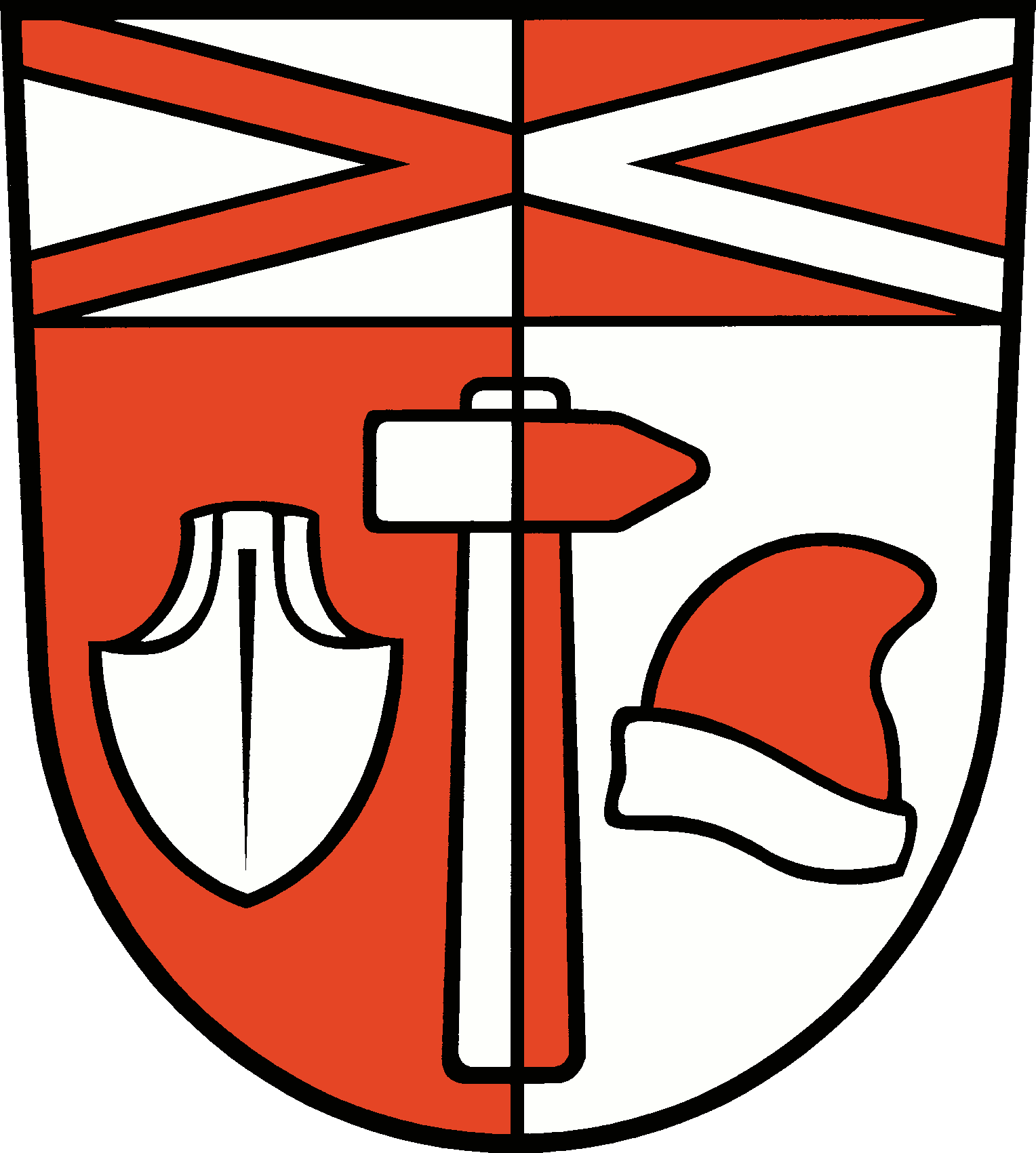
- Coat of arms

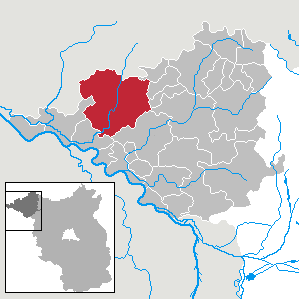
- Location of Karstädt within Prignitz district
- Interactive map of Karstädt
- Location within Germany Location within Brandenburg
- Coordinates: 53°08′59″N 11°45′00″E
- Country: Germany
- State: Brandenburg
- District: Prignitz

Government
  - Mayor (2019–27): Udo Staeck (CDU)

Area
  - Total: 253.55 km^{2} (97.90 sq mi)
- Elevation: 34 m (112 ft)

Population (2025-12-31)
  - Total: 5,734
  - Density: 22.61/km^{2} (58.57/sq mi)
- Time zone: UTC+01:00 (CET)
  - Summer (DST): UTC+02:00 (CEST)
- Postal codes: 19357
- Dialling codes: 038797
- Vehicle registration: PR
- Website: www.gemeinde-karstaedt.de

Karstädt (German pronunciation: [ˈkaʁʃtɛt]) is a municipality in the Prignitz district, in Brandenburg, Germany.

== Demography ==
Development of population since 1875 within the current Boundaries (Blue Line: Population; Dotted Line: Comparison to Population development in Brandenburg state; Grey Background: Time of Nazi Germany; Red Background: Time of communist East Germany)

Recent Population Development and Projections (Population Development before Census 2011 (blue line); Recent Population Development according to the Census in Germany in 2011 (blue bordered line); Official projections for 2005-2030 (yellow line); for 2017-2030 (scarlet line); for 2020-2030 (green line)

Karstädt: Population development
within the current boundaries (2020)

Year	Pop.	±% p.a.
1875	8,338	—
1890	8,054	−0.23%
1910	8,800	+0.44%
1925	9,172	+0.28%
1939	8,914	−0.20%
1950	13,168	+3.61%
1964	10,125	−1.86%

Year	Pop.	±% p.a.
1971	10,012	−0.16%
1981	9,480	−0.54%
1985	9,332	−0.39%
1990	9,015	−0.69%
1995	8,395	−1.41%
2000	7,808	−1.44%
2005	7,038	−2.06%

Year	Pop.	±% p.a.
2010	6,376	−1.96%
2015	5,983	−1.26%
2016	6,013	+0.50%
2017	5,989	−0.40%
2018	5,943	−0.77%
2019	5,967	+0.40%
2020	5,944	−0.39%
