= Stone Tower =

Stone Tower may refer to:

- Stone Tower (album), by Delerium
- Stone Tower (Dortmund), a historic watchtower in Dortmund, Germany
- Stone Tower (Ptolemy), a historical landmark on the Silk Road
