= Zarow =

River in Germany

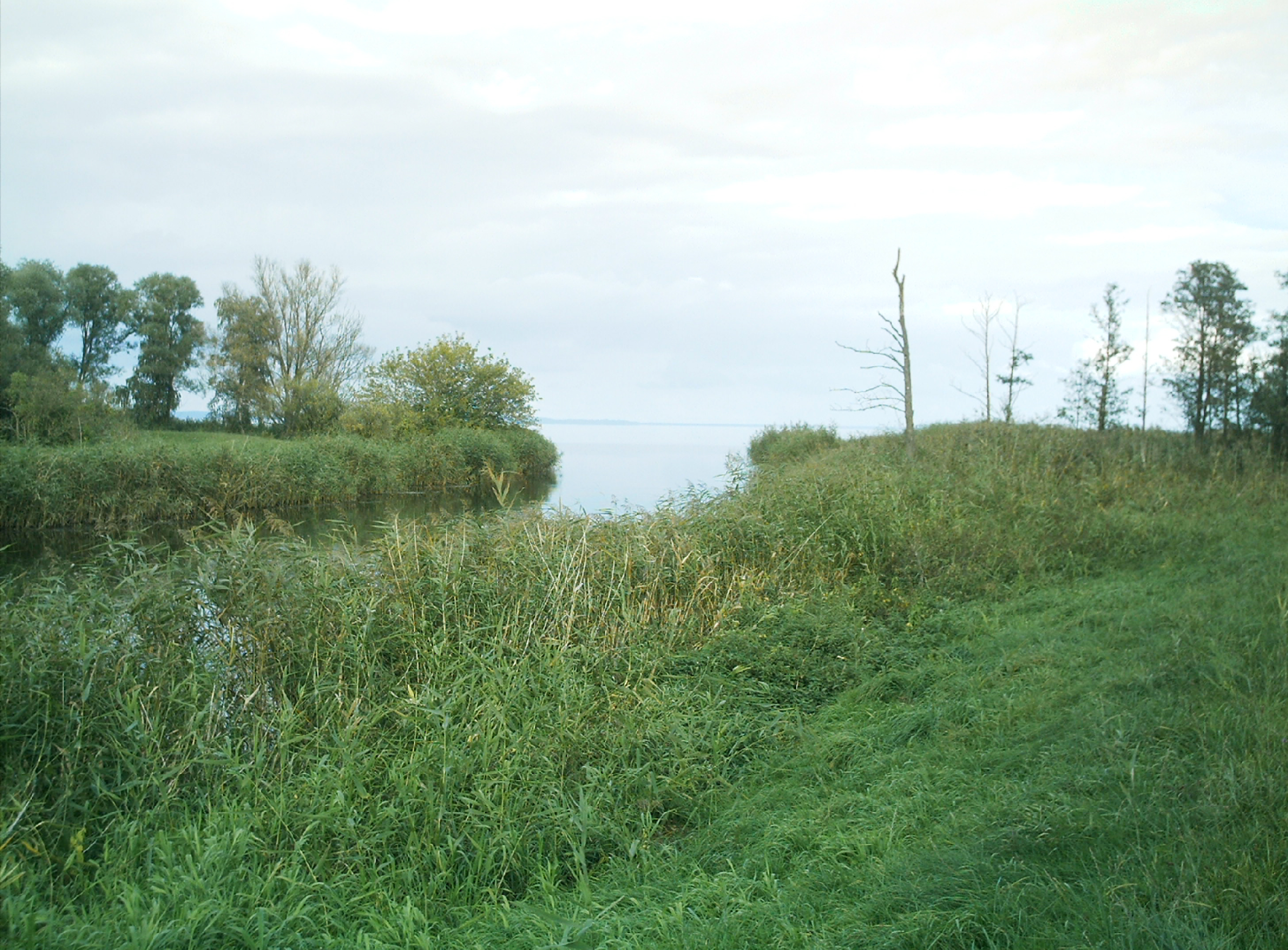
- Mouth of the Zarow

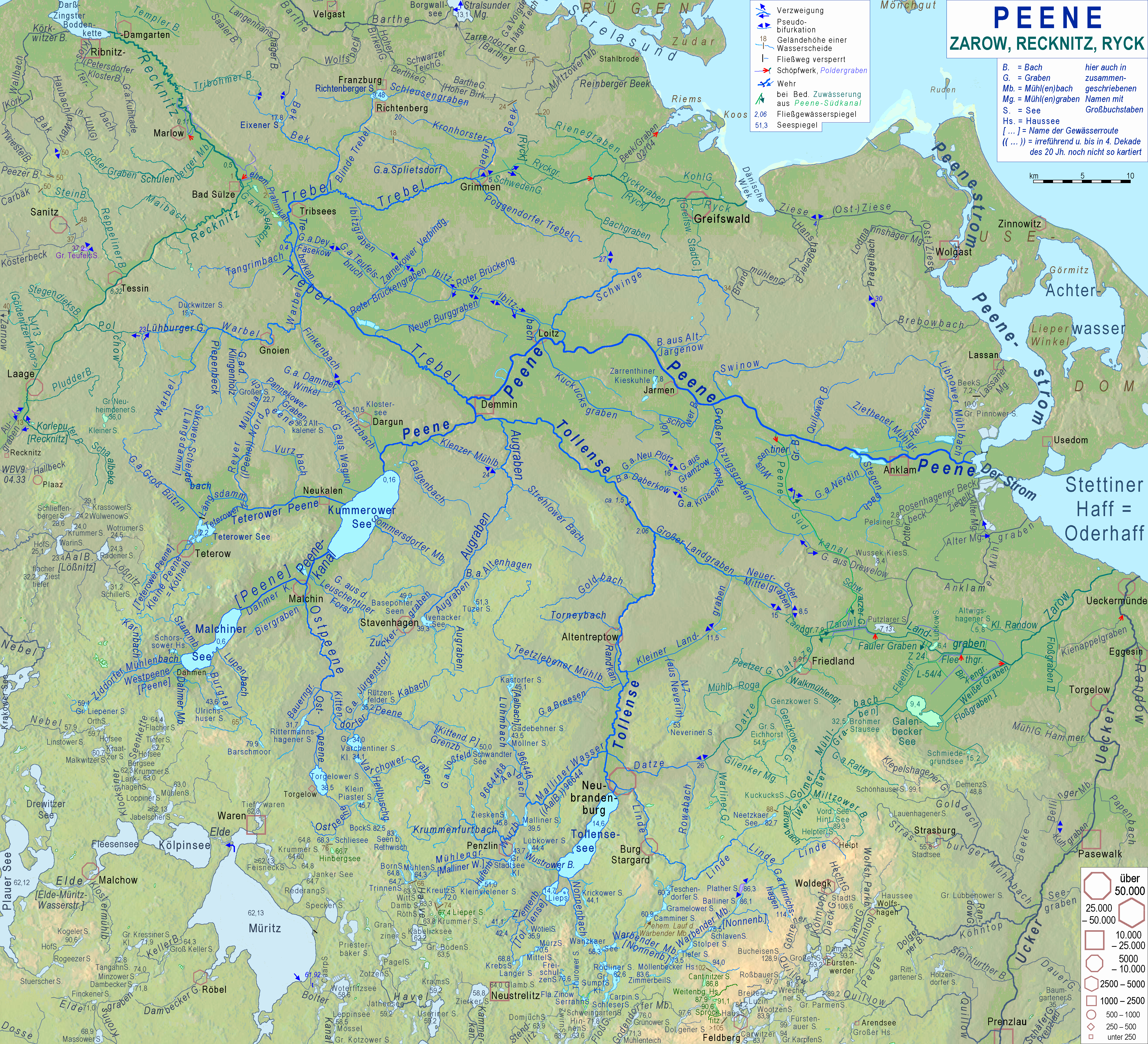
- River system of the Zarow (blue-green) east adjacent to that of the Peene; between the two Anklam mill ditches (gray)

Location
- Location: Mecklenburg-Vorpommern, Germany
- Reference no.: DE: 9694

Physical characteristics
- Source
  - location: Confluence of 2 major ditches at Ferdinandshof
  - coordinates: 53°40′07″N 13°52′13″E
  - elevation: 6 m
- Mouth
  - location: Stettin Lagoon at Grambin
  - coordinates: 53°45′27″N 14°01′53″E
- Length: 16 km

Basin features
- Progression: Stettin Lagoon
- River system: Zarow

The Zarow is a lowland river in Western Pomerania in the east of the state of Mecklenburg-Vorpommern in Germany.

== Description ==
The lower course of the river, also known topographically as Zarow, is formed from two ditches, the Landgraben and the Weißer Graben (White Ditch) coming from the Galenbecker See. Since its upper course, which flows into Lake Galenbecke, begins with the Zarowbach, near a hill called the Zarowberg, it can be assumed that the name 'Zarow' was originally associated with this watercourse. Hydrographically, however, the Landgraben is considered the (main) upper reaches of the Zarow, since it has a significantly larger catchment area with the northern part of the Datze (the southern part of which flows into the Tollense in Neubrandenburg).

The Friedländer Große Wiese area, which is traversed by numerous ditches, is drained inter alia by the Zarow. For this purpose, the water is raised from several lower polder ditches using pumping stationss in Landgraben and Zarow.

At the junction of two main ditches at Ferdinandshof, the river begins its approximately 16 km long journey north through the Ueckermünde Heath.

Around 1730, moorland settlements were laid out along the shore. The settlement of Zarowmühl is located near Ueckermünde. Towards the end of the 19th century, timber was rafted on the Zarow. Today the river is heavily overgrown with weeds in summer. In recent years, two weirs near Meiersberg and Zarowmühl have been demolished and environmentally friendly fish ladders have been erected. Nevertheless, due to heavy nutrient input, intensive agricultural use of the surrounding fields and meadows and other circumstances, the fish repeatedly die off.

In Grambin there are jetties that are used as a harbour for yachtsmen on the lagoon. The Zarow flows west of the Uecker, near Grambin, into the Stettiner Haff.

The course of the Zarow is considered to be the old cultural border between Western and Central Pomerania, which can be seen in the language as well as manners and customs. This is why west of the Zarow one eats Heißwecken (a type of currant bun), east of it Fastenbrezeln (a type of pretzel).
