= Datze =

River in Germany

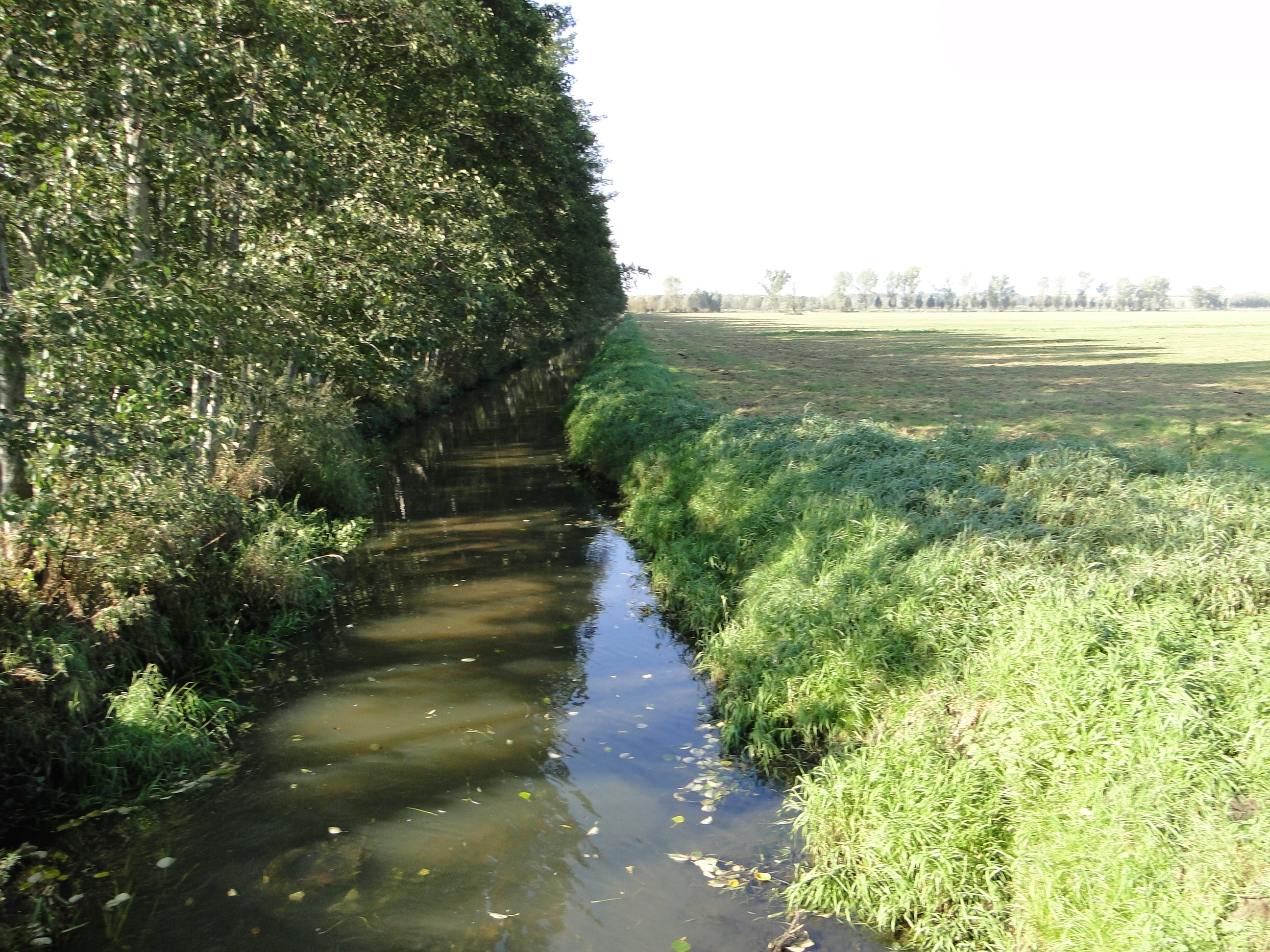

Location
- Country: Germany
- State: Mecklenburg-Vorpommern

Physical characteristics
- Mouth
  - location: Landgraben and Tollense
  - coordinates: 53.6954°N 13.5588°E and 53.5872°N 13.2384°E

Basin features
- Progression: Landgraben→ Zarow→ Baltic Sea; Tollense→ Peene→ Baltic Sea

The Datze is a river of Mecklenburg-Vorpommern, Germany. It forms a pseudobifurcation: its water northeast of Warlin flows towards Friedland and the Landgraben, and its water southwest of Warlin flows towards Neubrandenburg and the Tollense.

== See also ==
- List of rivers of Mecklenburg-Vorpommern
