= Großer Landgraben =

River in Germany

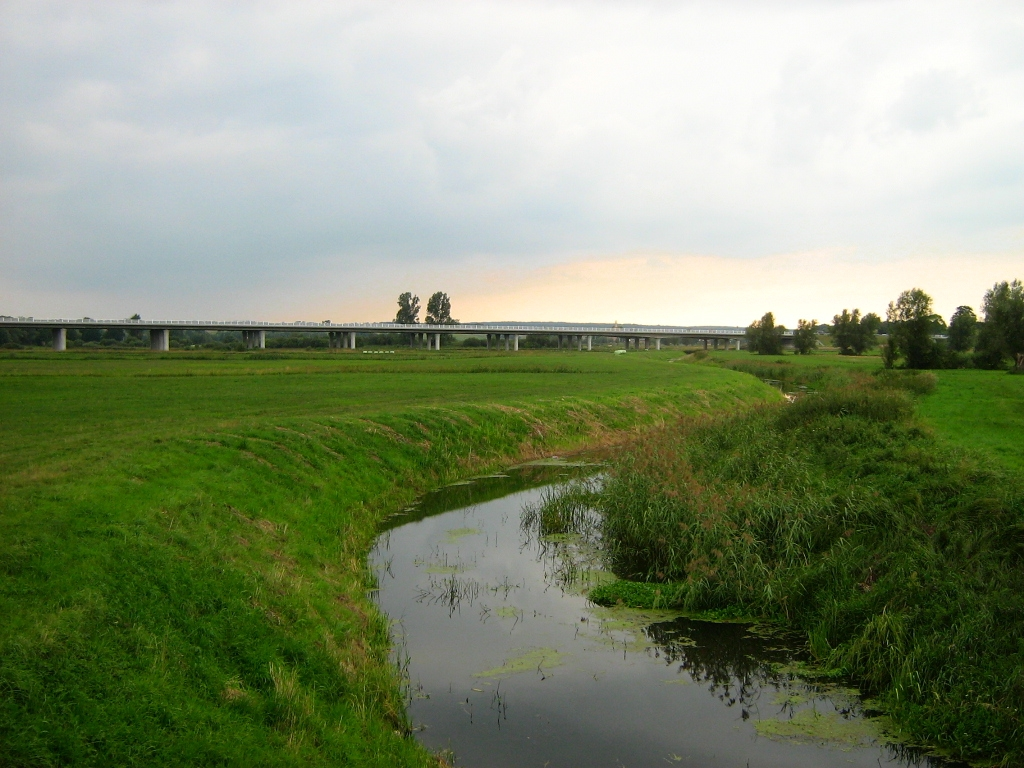

Location
- Country: Germany
- States: Mecklenburg-Vorpommern

Physical characteristics
- Mouth
  - location: Tollense
  - coordinates: 53.7918°N 13.3129°E

Basin features
- Progression: Tollense→ Peene→ Baltic Sea

The Großer Landgraben is a river of Mecklenburg-Vorpommern, Germany. It is formed at the confluence of Landgraben (west-flowing branch), Kleiner Landgraben (north-flowing branch) and Mittelgraben near Siedenbollentin. It flows into the Tollense in Klempenow.

== See also ==
- List of rivers of Mecklenburg-Vorpommern
