= Kleiner Landgraben =

River in Germany

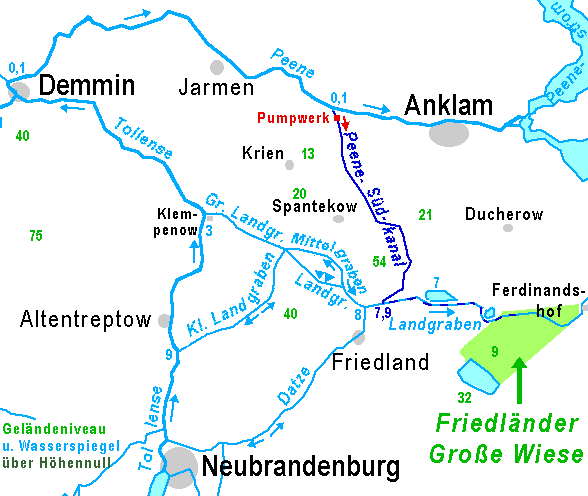

Location
- Country: Germany
- States: Mecklenburg-Vorpommern

Physical characteristics
- Mouth
  - location: Tollense and Großer Landgraben
  - coordinates: 53.6626°N 13.2686°E and 53.7518°N 13.4314°E

Basin features
- Progression: Tollense→ Peene→ Baltic Sea Großer Landgraben→ Tollense→ Peene→ Baltic Sea

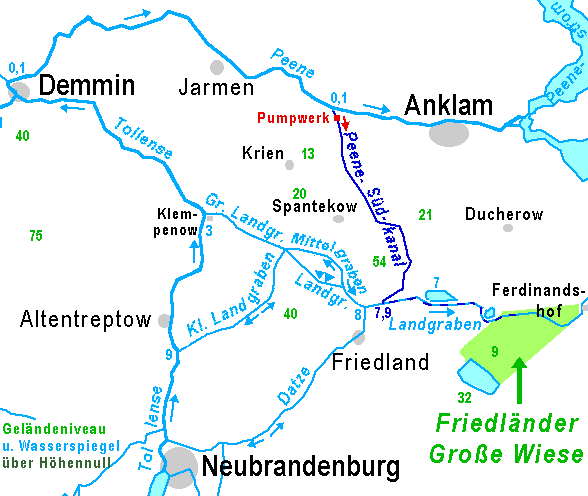
Tollense and the Landgraben system

The Kleiner Landgraben is a small river of Mecklenburg-Vorpommern, Germany. Collecting the water of a wetland and lateral sources, it is drained in both directions, in the south into Tollense River, and to the north into the Großer Landgraben, another affluent of Tollense River. Therefore, Kleiner Landgraben is a pseudobifurcation. The meaning of Kleiner Landgraben is something like "Small Border Canal". For several centuries it was part of the border between Mecklenburg and Pomerania. The Landgraben drains one of the broad glacial valleys of Mecklenburg-Vorpommern. In these valleys, there is no strict discrimination between natural and artificial courses of water.

== See also ==
- List of rivers of Mecklenburg-Vorpommern
