= Landgraben (Mecklenburg-Vorpommern) =

River in Germany

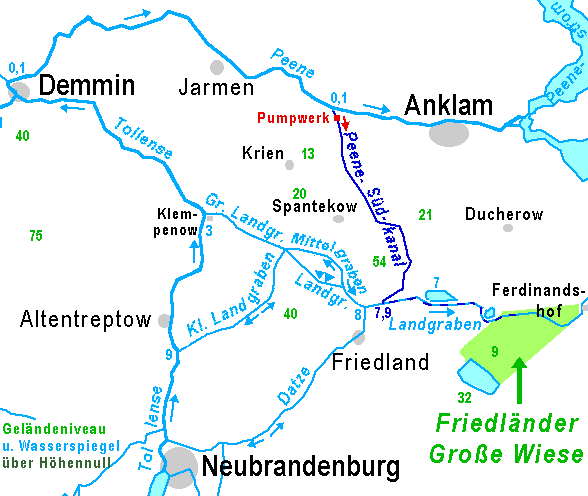

Location
- Country: Germany
- States: Mecklenburg-Vorpommern

Physical characteristics
- Mouth
  - location: Zarow and Großer Landgraben
  - coordinates: 53.6687°N 13.8704°E and 53.7518°N 13.4314°E

Basin features
- Progression: Zarow→ Baltic Sea; Großer Landgraben→ Tollense→ Peene→ Baltic Sea

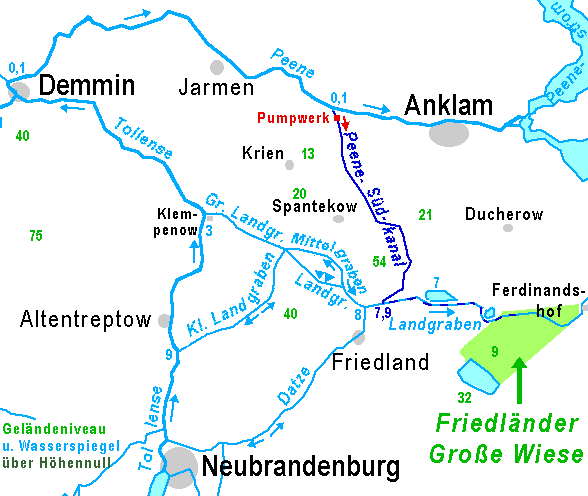
Peene South Canal, Landgraben, Kleiner Landgraben and Großer Landgraben

Landgraben is a river of Mecklenburg-Vorpommern, Germany. It is 22.5 km (14.0 mi) long.

It forms a pseudobifurcation: its water west of Friedland flows towards the Großer Landgraben and the Tollense, and its water east of Friedland flows towards the Zarow, which flows into the Szczecin Lagoon. Its main tributary is the northflowing bifurcation of the Datze River, almost in the middle of its bed.

The approximate meaning of Landgraben is "Border Canal". For several centuries it was part of the border between Mecklenburg and Pomerania. The Landgraben drains one of the broad glacial valleys of Mecklenburg-Vorpommern. In these valleys, there is no strict discrimination between natural and artificial courses of water.

== See also ==
- List of rivers of Mecklenburg-Vorpommern
