= Stone Tower (Dortmund) =

Coordinates: 51°29′48.73″N 7°27′32.76″E

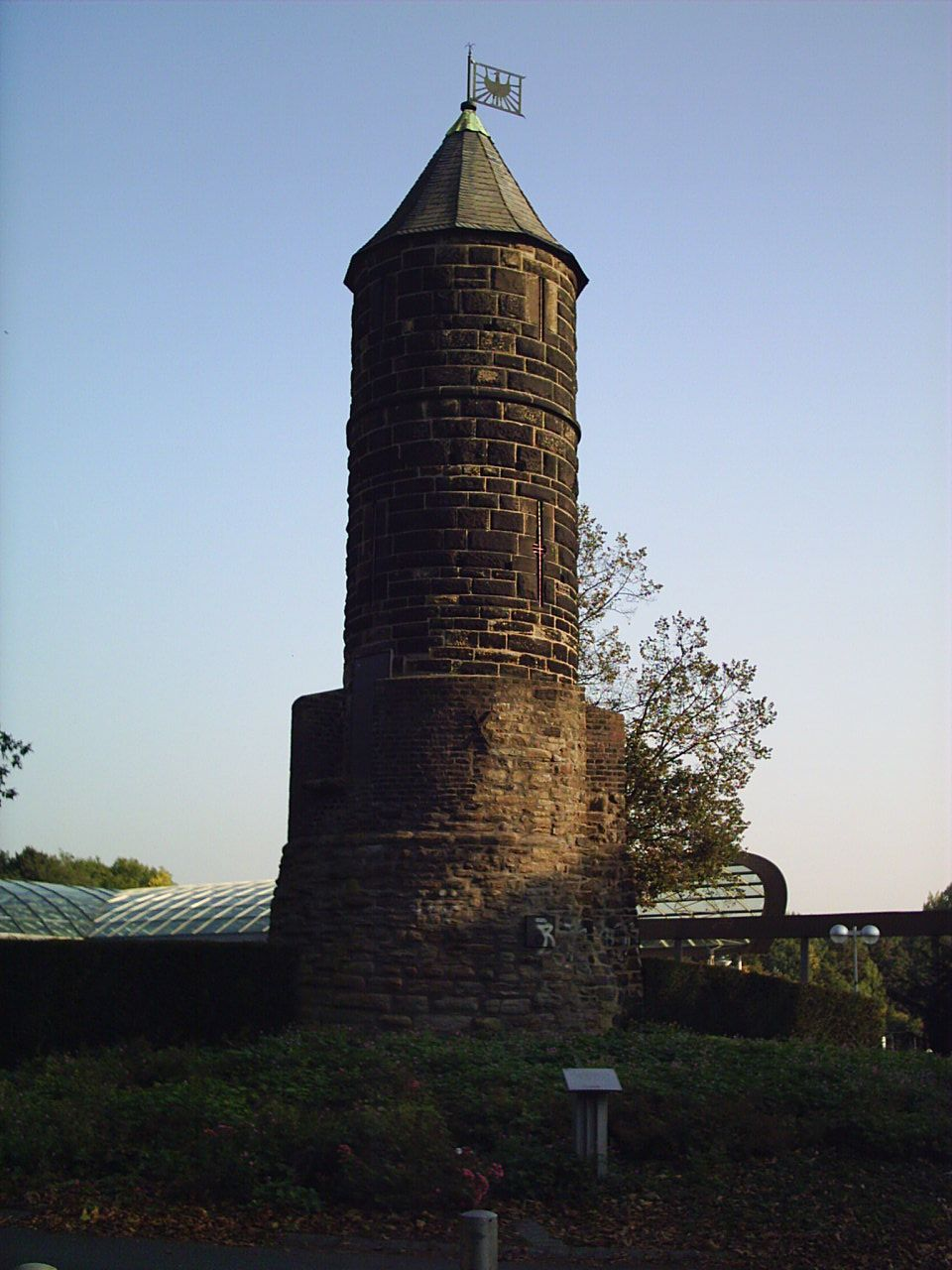
The Stone Tower in Dortmund

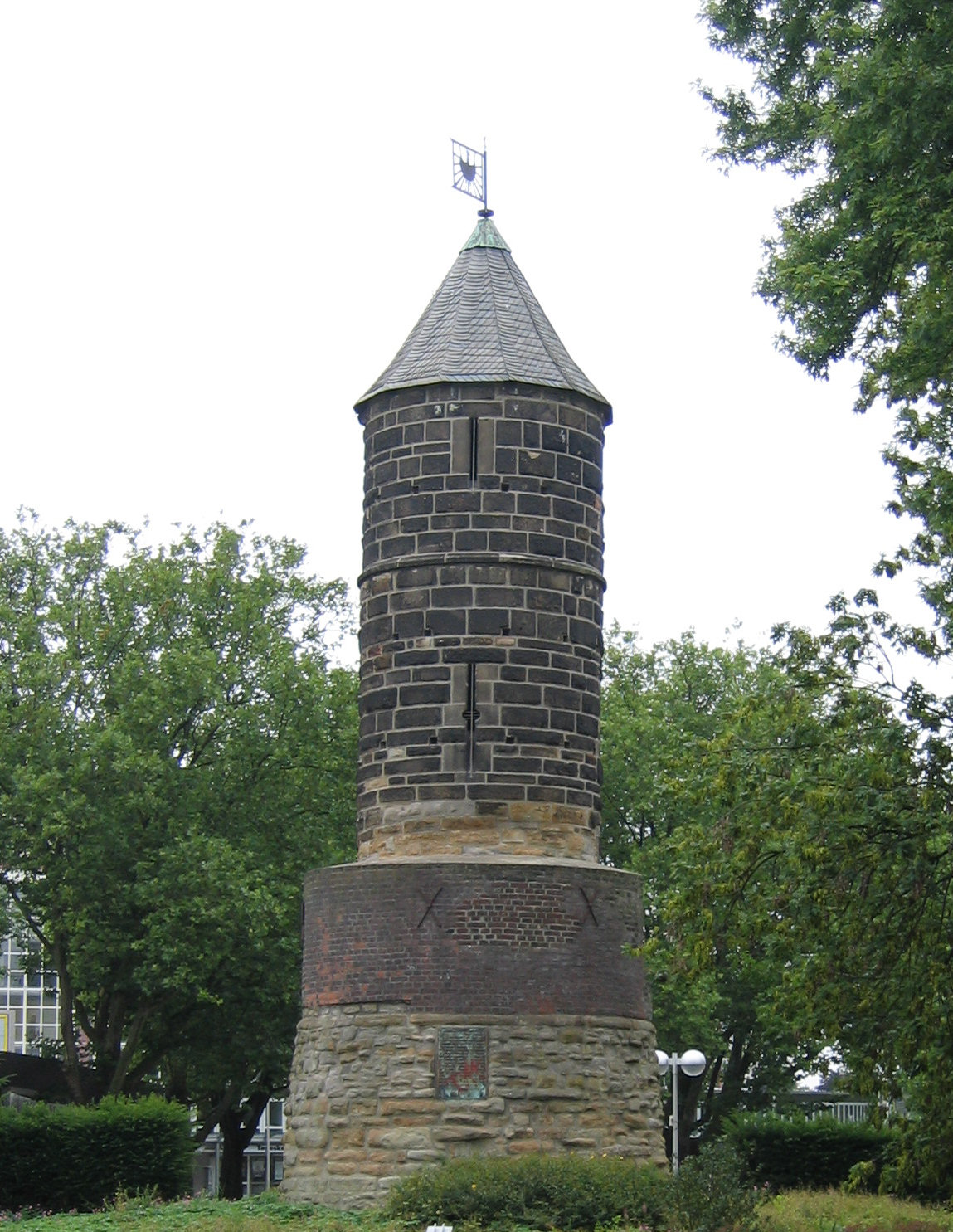
The Stone Tower by day

The Stone Tower (German: Steinerne Turm) is a protected monument and historic watchtower in the city of Dortmund, Germany, not far from the Westfalenhallen.

== History ==
The tower was part of the military defences of the medieval free imperial city of Dortmund and built some distance in front of the city walls of the historic city centre. The watchtower controlled the trade route that ran south from the city to Cologne. It stood on the historical border of Stadthagen, the fortified land around the city that had existed since the 13th century and within which the city rights applied.

Dortmund's Stadthagen was fortified in the 14th century. During the Soest Feud in the mid-15th century the Stone Tower was besieged and damaged by enemy troops, as a consequence of which the lower part was reinforced with thick brick walls. The lower half of the Stone Tower is original, the upper half has been reconstructed.

In addition to this southern watchtower there were another five observation points around the city at comparable distances from it: the Freden Tower (Fredenturm) in the north, the Ederloes Watchtower (Ederloeswarte) in the northeast, the Osterruter Watchtower (Osterruterwarte) in the east, the Bergfrede on the River Emscher and in the west the Westerruter Watchtower ( Westerruterwarte). Later the Hörde Watchtower (Hörder Warte) was built to the south of the Stone Tower on the border between the County of Dortmund and County of Mark on the Emscher.

The Stone Tower is a listed building entered in the monument register of the city of Dortmund.

== Access ==
The Stone Tower is south of the B1, immediately west of the U-Bahn station of Westfalenhallen. This is served by the U45 and U46 lines as well as bus no. 450 of the DSW21.

== Historical views ==
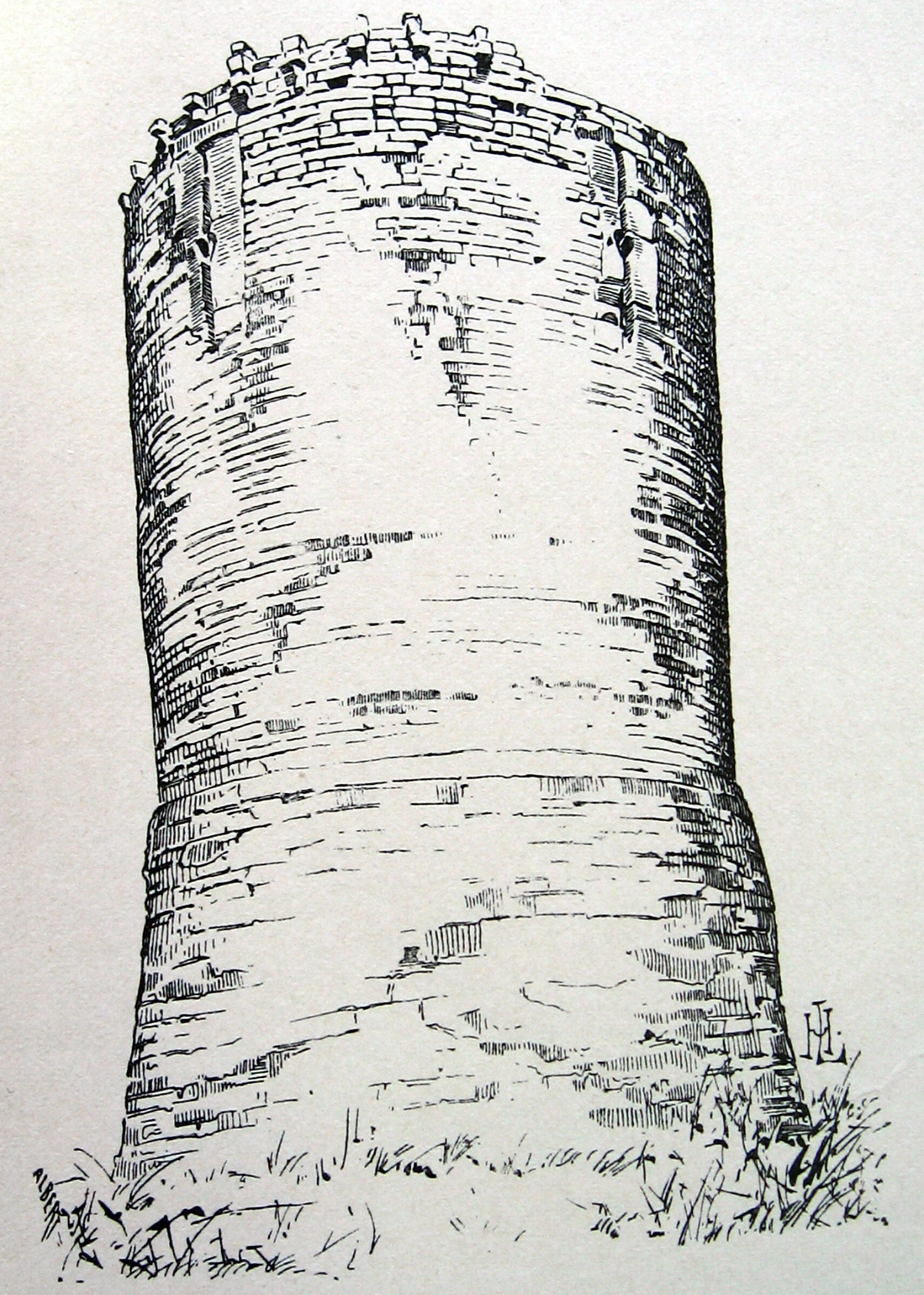
The Stone Tower in a drawing by Albert Ludorff c. 1890.

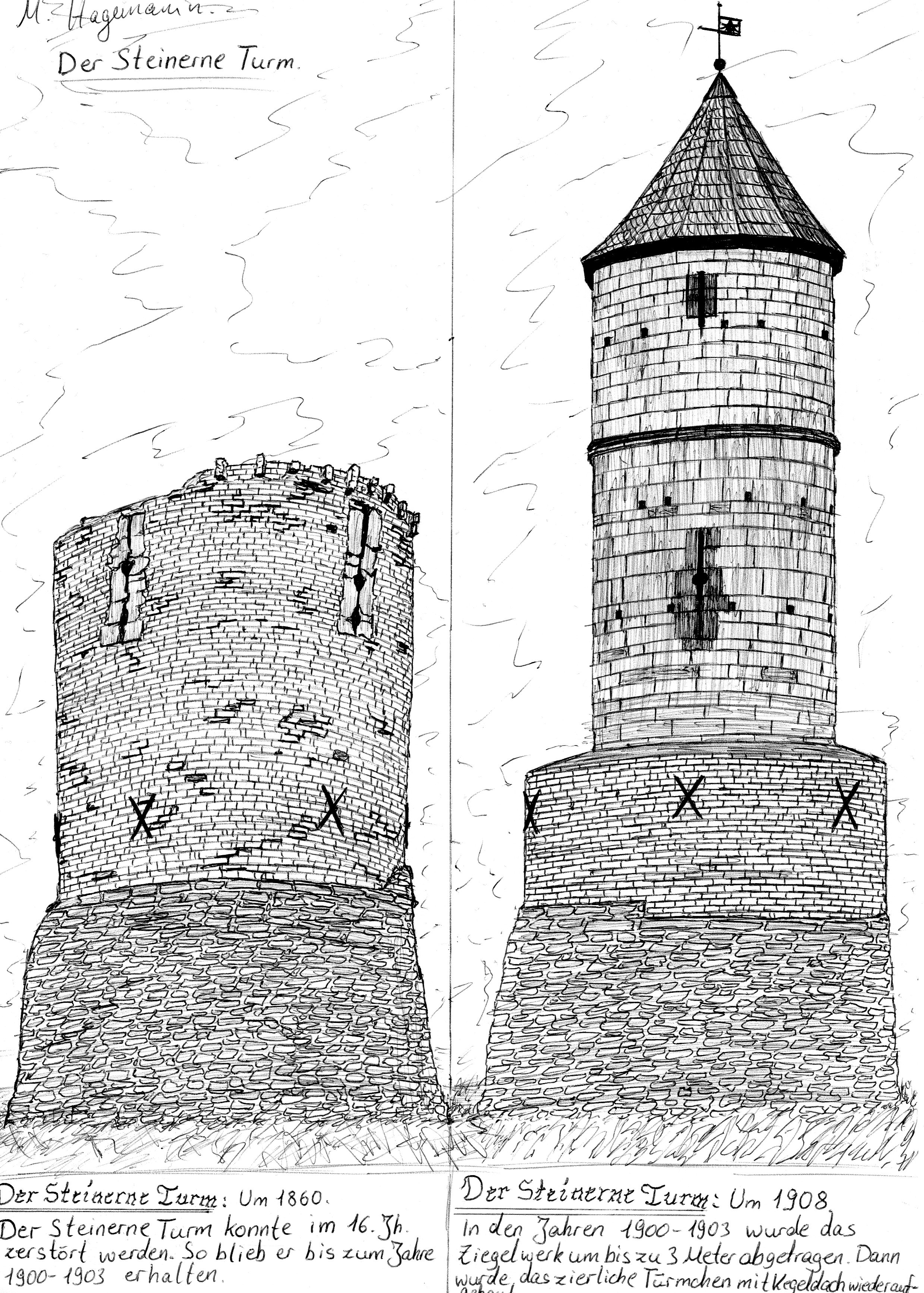
The Stone Tower before and after remodelling.

== Literature ==
- Althoff, Christiane: Die Befestigung der Stadt Dortmund - Ergebnisse der Stadtkernarchäologie, Dortmund, 1996. ISBN 3-930504-05-7
- Michalak, Tim: Die Stadthagen. Zur Bedeutung und Funktion der Landwehren an den Grenzen der reichsstädtischen Feldmark Dortmunds. In: Heimat Dortmund 1/2002. Stadtgeschichte in Bildern und Berichten. Zeitschrift des Historischen Vereins für Dortmund und die Grafschaft Mark e.V. in Verbindung mit dem Stadtarchiv Dortmund. pp. 12–15. ISSN 0932-9757
