= Bundesautobahn 24 =

Federal motorway in Germany

A 24
- Bundesautobahn 24

Route information
- Length: 237 km (147 mi)

Major junctions
- West end: Sievekingsallee in Hamburg
- East end: A 10 near Berlin

Location
- Country: Germany
- States: Hamburg, Schleswig-Holstein, Mecklenburg-Vorpommern, Brandenburg

Highway system
- Roads in Germany; Autobahns; List; Federal; List; State; E-roads
← A 23	→ A 25

Bundesautobahn 24 (translates from German as Federal Motorway 24, short form Autobahn 24, abbreviated as BAB 24 or A 24) is an autobahn in northern Germany that connects the large metropolitan regions of Hamburg and Berlin. It was one of the three transit access roads to West Berlin during the Cold War. The other two being the A2 and the A9.

On that road, there is a 150 km (93 mi) long section that has no speed limit at all (only a recommended speed of 130 km/h), which means that about 65% of that Autobahn can be driven at very high speed.

== History ==
Planning for the autobahn began as far back as the 1930s; before World War II numerous bridges and sections of roadside shoulder were built between Hamburg and Berlin. The German divide, however, put a hold on further work and it was not until 1978 that construction was resumed, carried out by a GDR work force and paid for by West Germany. In 1982 the A 24 could finally be opened. Most pre-war bridges could not be used, however, and were replaced by new structures.

== Exit list ==
State	District	Location	km	mi	Exit	Name	Destinations	Notes
Hamburg	Hamburg-Mitte	Horn, Hamburg	0.0	0.0	1	Hamburg-Horn	Hamburg-Horn, Hamburg Airport	Western endpoint of motorway Roundabout with local roads
Hamburg	Hamburg-Mitte	Billstedt	3.5	2.2	2	Hamburg-Jenfeld	Hamburg-Jenfeld	
Schleswig-Holstein	Stormarn	Barsbüttel	6.6	4.1	3	Hamburg-Ost interchange	A 1 / E22 – Bremen, Hannover, Hamburg-Zentrum, Hamburg-Öjendorf, Fehmarn, Lübeck, Rostock, Barsbüttel	no ramps between Lübeck and Berlin
Schleswig-Holstein	Stormarn	Barsbüttel	10.8	6.7	4	Reinbek	Reinbek, Glinde, Barsbüttel	
Schleswig-Holstein	Stormarn	Reinbek	15.8	9.8	Rest area	Hahnenkoppel	Hahnenkoppel rest area	
Schleswig-Holstein	Stormarn	Witzhave	17.4	10.8	5	Witzhave	Witzhave, Trittau, Grande	Trittau and Grande are only signed eastbound
Schleswig-Holstein	Herzogtum Lauenburg	Kasseburg	23.0	14.3	6	Schwarzenbek/Grande	B 404 – Schwarzenbek, Grande, Lauenburg, Kiel( A 21), Lübeck( A 1 / E22)	Lauenburg is only signed eastbound Kiel and Lübeck are only signed westbound
Schleswig-Holstein	Herzogtum Lauenburg	Kasseburg	23.0	14.3	6	Schwarzenbek/Grande interchange	A 21 – Kiel, Lüneburg	interchange proposed
Schleswig-Holstein	Herzogtum Lauenburg	Elmenhorst	33.1	20.6	7	Talkau	B 207 – Talkau, Mölln, Schwarzenbek, Ratzeburg	Schwarzenbek is only signed westbound
Schleswig-Holstein	Herzogtum Lauenburg	Tramm	37.1	23.1	Rest area	Tramm	Tramm rest area	westbound only
Schleswig-Holstein	Herzogtum Lauenburg	Rosenburg	37.9	23.5	Rest area	Roseburg	Roseburg rest area	eastbound only
Schleswig-Holstein	Herzogtum Lauenburg	Hornbek	39.0	24.2	8	Hornbek	Hornbek, Büchen, Lauenburg	
Schleswig-Holstein	Herzogtum Lauenburg	Besenthal	44.8	27.8	8b	Gudow	Gudow, Büchen	
Schleswig-Holstein	Herzogtum Lauenburg	Gudow	50.4	31.3	Rest area	Gudow	Gudow rest area	rest area is equipped with a gas station and a restaurant Rest area is a former border checkpoint between west and east germany
Mecklenburg-Vorpommern	Ludwigslust-Parchim	Lüttow-Valluhn	52.7	32.7	9a	Gallin	Gallin	incomplete junction: only ramps from and towards Hamburg
Mecklenburg-Vorpommern	Ludwigslust-Parchim	Lüttow-Valluhn	53.6	33.3	Rest area	Schaalsee	Schaalsee	rest area is equipped with a gas station and a restaurant eastbound only
Mecklenburg-Vorpommern	Ludwigslust-Parchim	Lüttow-Valluhn	56.5	35.1	9b	Zarrentin	B 195 – Zarrentin, Boizenburg	
Mecklenburg-Vorpommern	Ludwigslust-Parchim	Wittenburg	69.7	43.3	10	Wittenburg	Wittenburg, Hagenow-Kietz	
Mecklenburg-Vorpommern	Ludwigslust-Parchim	Wittenburg	71.9	44.7	Rest area	Wittenburger Land	Wittenburger Land rest area	
Mecklenburg-Vorpommern	Ludwigslust-Parchim	Bandenitz	81.6	50.7	11	Hagenow	B 321 – Hagenow, Schwerin	
Mecklenburg-Vorpommern	Ludwigslust-Parchim	Hoort	87.0	54.1	Rest area	Schremheide	Schremheide rest area	
Mecklenburg-Vorpommern	Ludwigslust-Parchim	Wöbbelin	98.3	61.1	12	Wöbbelin	Wöbbelin, Schwerin, Ludwigslust-Nord	
Mecklenburg-Vorpommern	Ludwigslust-Parchim	Wöbbelin	100.3	62.3	13	Schwerin interchange	A 14 – Wismar, Rostock, Schwerin, Ludwigslust	Rostock is only signed eastbound
Mecklenburg-Vorpommern	Ludwigslust-Parchim	Neustadt-Glewe	108.6	67.5	14	Neustadt-Glewe	B 191 – Parchim-West, Parchim International Airport; Neustadt-Glewe, Ludwigslust	
Mecklenburg-Vorpommern	Ludwigslust-Parchim	Brenz	110.9	68.9	Rest area	Blievenstorf	Blievenstorf rest area	
Mecklenburg-Vorpommern	Ludwigslust-Parchim	Stolpe	116.1	72.1	Rest area	Stolpe	Stolpe rest area	
Mecklenburg-Vorpommern	Ludwigslust-Parchim	Karrenzin	121.5	75.5	15	Parchim	Parchim, Ziegendorf	
Brandenburg	Prignitz	Putlitz	135.2	84.0	16	Suckow	B 321 – Suckow, Parchim-Süd, Parchim International Airport	Parchim Süd and Parchim int. Airport are only signed westbound
Brandenburg	Prignitz	Putlitz	141.4	87.9	Parking area	—	Parking area	
Brandenburg	Prignitz	Putlitz	142.6	88.6	17	Putlitz	Putlitz	
Brandenburg	Prignitz	Triglitz	146.7	91.2	Rest area	Dorngrund	Dorngrund rest area	
Brandenburg	Prignitz	Gerdshagen	152.2	94.6	18	Meyenburg	B 103 – Meyenburg, Pritzwalk-Nord, Plau am See	Pritzwalk-Nord is only signed eastbound Plau am See is only signed westbound
Brandenburg	Prignitz	Pritzwalk	158.3	98.4	Parking area	Kiebitzberg (eastbound); Blesenberg (westbound)	Kiebitzberg parking area (eastbound); Blesenberg parking area (westbound)	
Brandenburg	Ostprignitz-Ruppin	Heiligengrabe	168.7	104.8	19	Pritzwalk	B 189 – Pritzwalk, Heiligengrabe, Wittstock	Wittstock is only signed eastbound
Brandenburg	Ostprignitz-Ruppin	Wittstock/Dosse	172.8	107.4	20	Wittstock/Dosse interchange	A 19 / E55 – Rostock, Wittstock	main carriageway runs between Berlin and Rostock
Brandenburg	Ostprignitz-Ruppin	Heiligengrabe	175.1	108.8	Rest area	Prignitz	Prignitz rest area	rest area equipped with a restaurant
Brandenburg	Ostprignitz-Ruppin	Wittstock/Dosse	181.6	112.8	21	Herzsprung	Herzsprung, Kyritz	Kyritz is only signed eastbound
Brandenburg	Ostprignitz-Ruppin	Wittstock/Dosse	185.1	115.0	Parking area	—	Parking area	
Brandenburg	Ostprignitz-Ruppin	Temnitzquell	189.7	117.9	Rest area	Rossower Heide	Rossower Heide rest area	westbound only
Brandenburg	Ostprignitz-Ruppin	Temnitzquell	192.1	119.4	Rest area	—	Rest area	eastbound only
Brandenburg	Ostprignitz-Ruppin	Walsleben	197.8	122.9	Rest area	Walsleben	Walsleben rest area	rest area equipped with a gas station and a restaurant
Brandenburg	Ostprignitz-Ruppin	Dabergotz	205.1	127.4	22	Neuruppin	B 167 – Neuruppin, Rheinsberg, Bückwitz, Neustadt (Dosse), Kyritz	Bückwitz is only signed eastbound Kyritz is only signed westbound
Brandenburg	Ostprignitz-Ruppin	Neuruppin	208.7	129.7	Rest area	Ruppiner See	Ruppiner See rest area	
Brandenburg	Ostprignitz-Ruppin	Fehrbellin	211.9	131.7	23	Neuruppin-Süd	Neuruppin-Süd	
Brandenburg	Ostprignitz-Ruppin	Fehrbellin	217.2	135.0	24	Fehrbellin	Fehrbellin	
Brandenburg	Ostprignitz-Ruppin	Fehrbellin	224.5	139.5	Rest area	Linumer Bruch	Linumer Bruch rest area	rest area equipped with a gas station and a restaurant
Brandenburg	Oberhavel	Kremmen	234.0	145.4	25	Kremmen	B 273 – Kremmen, Nauen	
Brandenburg	Oberhavel	Kremmen	236.5	147.0	26	Havelland interchange	A 10 / E26 – Frankfurt (Oder), Prenzlau, Berlin-Zentrum; A 10 / E55 – Leipzig, Magdeburg, Potsdam	Eastern endpoint od motorway
1.000 mi = 1.609 km; 1.000 km = 0.621 mi: Incomplete access; Proposed

== Pictures ==
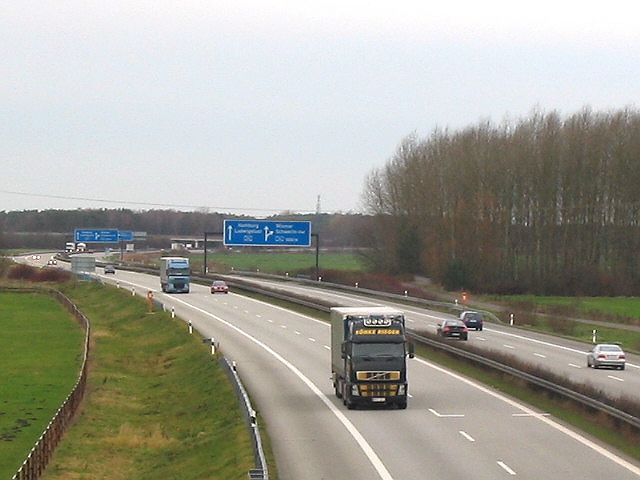
Autobahn 24 near junction Schwerin

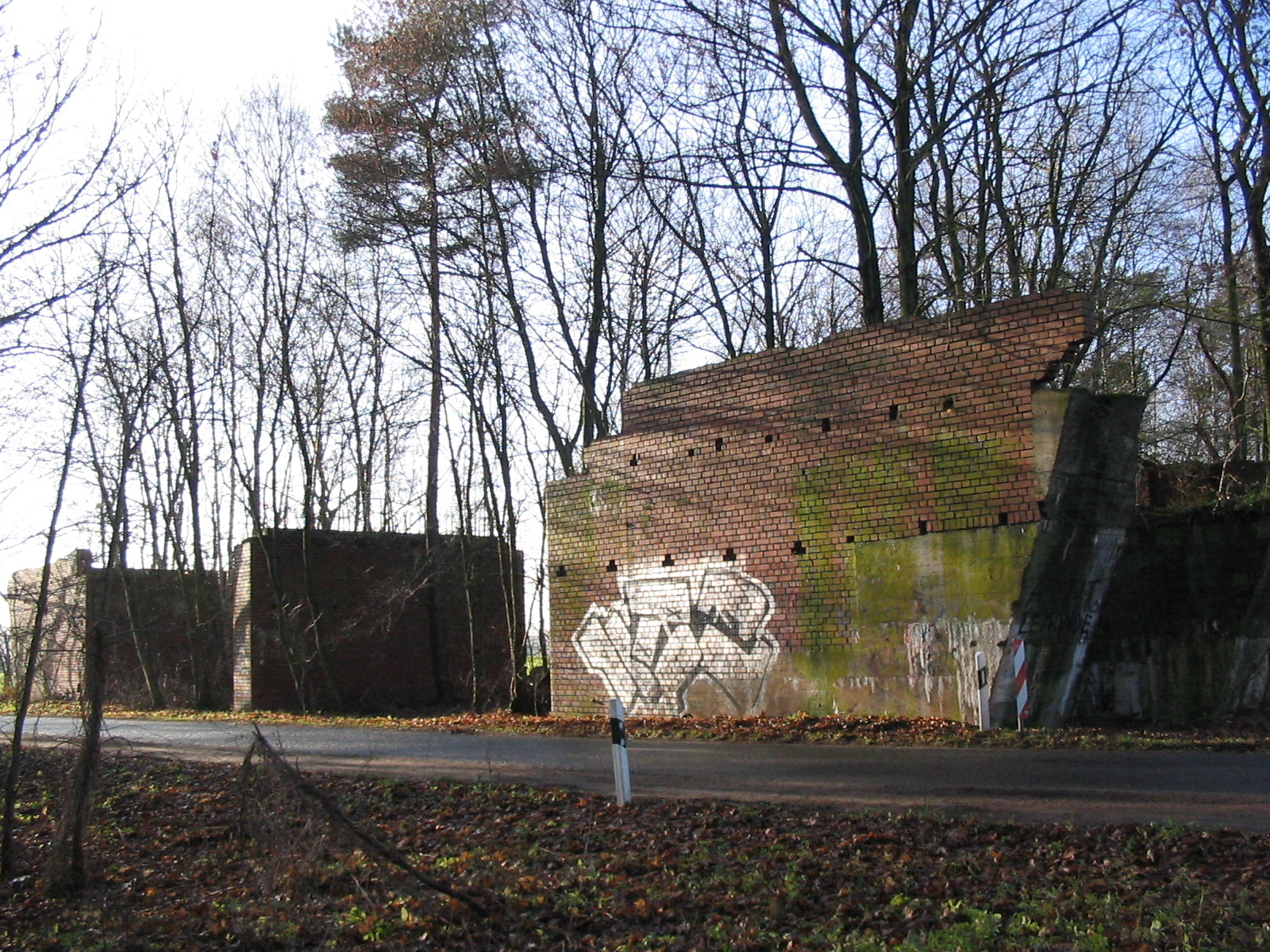
unused bridge near Hagenow on the former planned route of the 1930s

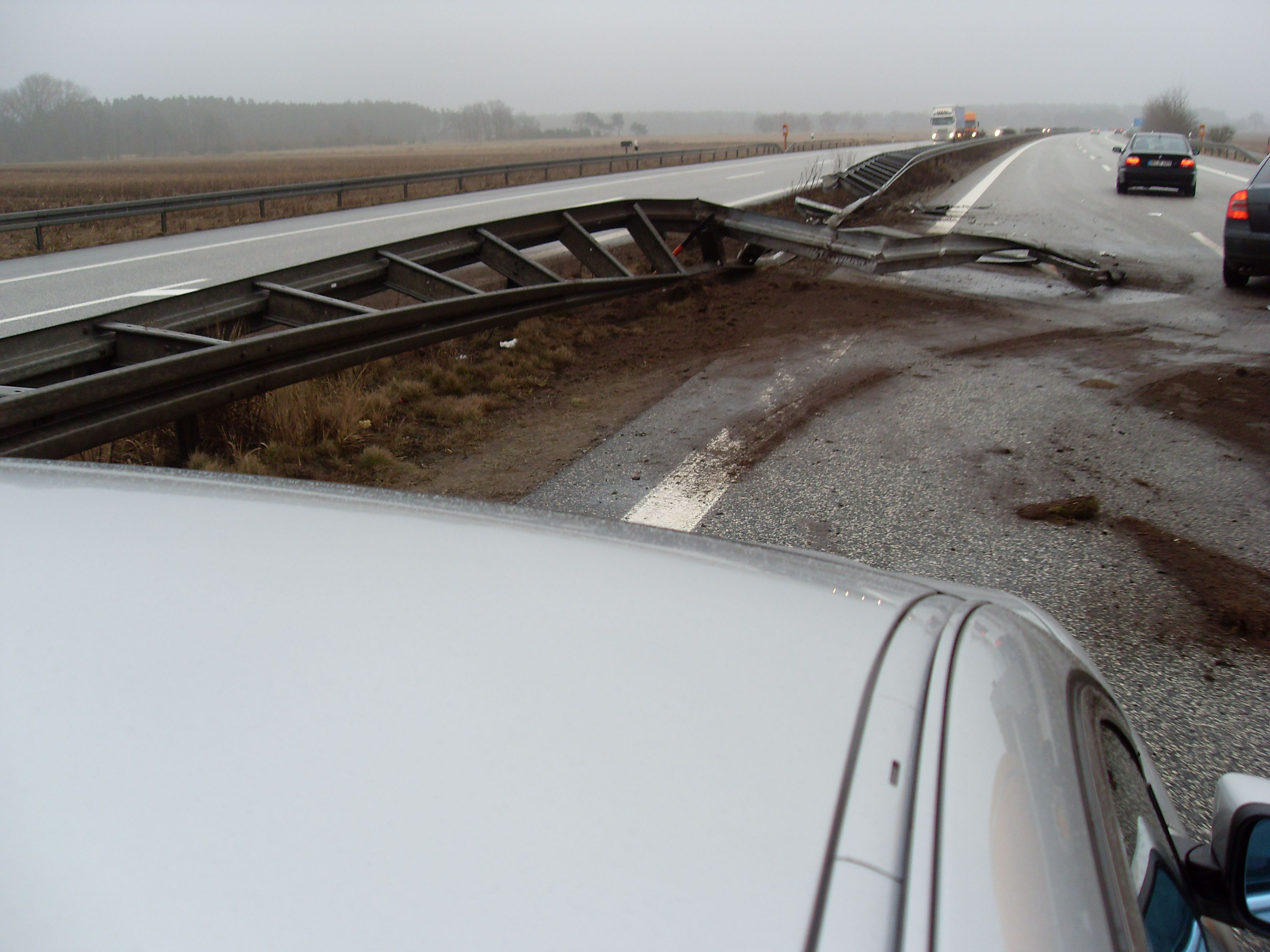
Truck destroyed the central barrier on the A24 (Feb. 2009)
