= Zarrentin (Amt) =

Administrative division in Germany

- Amt
- Map of Ludwigslust-Parchim highlighting Zarrentin
- Interactive map of Zarrentin
- Location within Germany Location within Mecklenburg-Vorpommern
- Coordinates: 53°30′N 10°55′E
- Country: Germany
- State: Mecklenburg-Vorpommern
- District: Ludwigslust-Parchim
- Seat: Zarrentin am Schaalsee
- Subdivisions: 5 municipalities

Area
  - Total: 275.79 km^{2} (106.48 sq mi)

Population (2025-12-31)
  - Total: 10,079
  - Density: 36.546/km^{2} (94.654/sq mi)
- Time zone: UTC+01:00 (CET)
  - Summer (DST): UTC+02:00 (CEST)
- Website: www.amt-zarrentin.de

Zarrentin is an Amt in the Ludwigslust-Parchim district, in Mecklenburg-Vorpommern, Germany. The seat of the Amt is in Zarrentin am Schaalsee.

The Amt Zarrentin consists of the following municipalities:

1. Gallin
2. Kogel
3. Lüttow-Valluhn
4. Vellahn
5. Zarrentin am Schaalsee
