= Gudow =

- Municipality
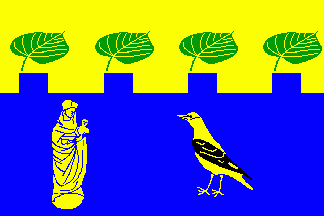
- Flag Coat of arms

- Location of Gudow within Herzogtum Lauenburg district
- Interactive map of Gudow
- Location within Germany Location within Schleswig-Holstein
- Coordinates: 53°33′19″N 10°46′28″E
- Country: Germany
- State: Schleswig-Holstein
- District: Herzogtum Lauenburg
- Municipal assoc.: Büchen

Government
  - Mayor: Jürgen Holst

Area
  - Total: 42.26 km^{2} (16.32 sq mi)
- Elevation: 25 m (82 ft)

Population (2025-12-31)
  - Total: 1,763
  - Density: 41.72/km^{2} (108.0/sq mi)
- Time zone: UTC+01:00 (CET)
  - Summer (DST): UTC+02:00 (CEST)
- Postal codes: 23899
- Dialling codes: 04547
- Vehicle registration: RZ
- Website: www.buechen.de

Gudow is a municipality in the district of Lauenburg, in Schleswig-Holstein, Germany.

== History ==
Since 1470 the Bülow family have owned the estate and manor house of Gudow.

Between 1982 and 1990 Gudow served as West German inner German border crossing for cars travelling along Bundesautobahn 24 between the East German Democratic Republic, or West Berlin and the West German Federal Republic of Germany. The traffic was subject to the Interzonal traffic regulations, that between West Germany and West Berlin followed the special regulations of the Transit Agreement (1972).

== Demographics ==
As of the 2022 census, Gudow had a population of 1,745 of which 1,618 (92.72%) were born in Germany.

== See also ==
- Gudow-Sterley
