= Storbeck-Frankendorf =

- Municipality
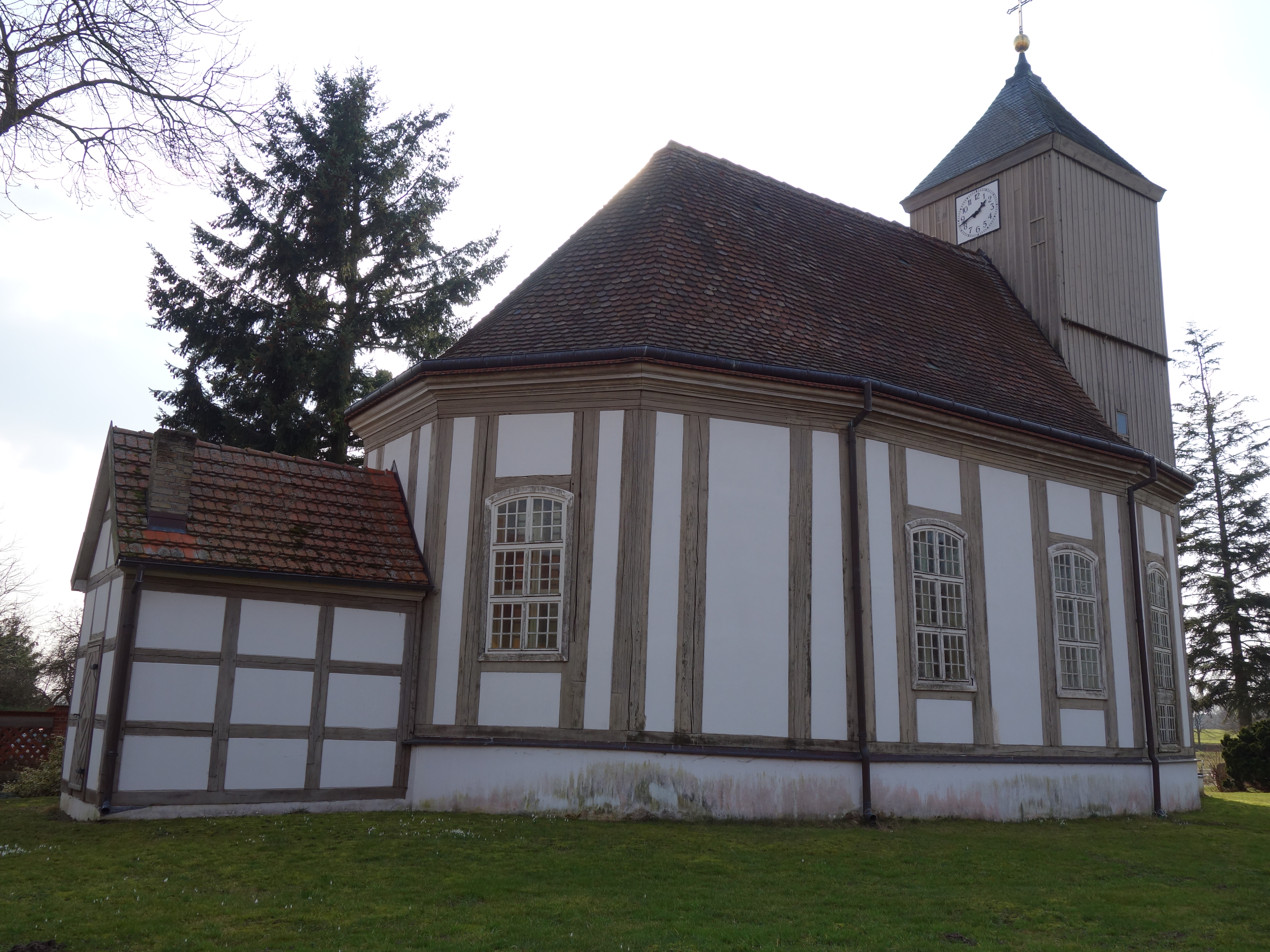
- Village church in Storbeck

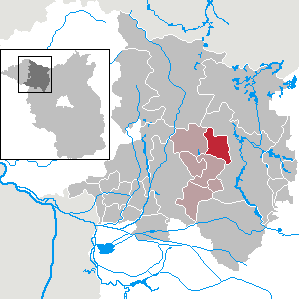
- Location of Storbeck-Frankendorf within Ostprignitz-Ruppin district
- Interactive map of Storbeck-Frankendorf
- Location within Germany Location within Brandenburg
- Coordinates: 52°58′00″N 12°46′00″E
- Country: Germany
- State: Brandenburg
- District: Ostprignitz-Ruppin
- Municipal assoc.: Temnitz

Government
  - Mayor (2024–29): Frank Ißleib

Area
  - Total: 42.23 km^{2} (16.31 sq mi)
- Elevation: 44 m (144 ft)

Population (2025-12-31)
  - Total: 485
  - Density: 11.5/km^{2} (29.7/sq mi)
- Time zone: UTC+01:00 (CET)
  - Summer (DST): UTC+02:00 (CEST)
- Postal codes: 16818
- Dialling codes: 033920
- Vehicle registration: OPR

Storbeck-Frankendorf is a municipality in the Ostprignitz-Ruppin district, in Brandenburg, Germany.

== Demography ==
Development of population since 1875 within the current boundaries (Blue line: Population; Dotted line: Comparison to population development of Brandenburg state; Grey background: Time of Nazi rule; Red background: Time of communist rule)

Storbeck-Frankendorf: Population development
within the current boundaries (2013)

Year	Pop.	±% p.a.
1875	832	—
1890	802	−0.24%
1910	689	−0.76%
1925	676	−0.13%
1933	658	−0.34%
1939	654	−0.10%
1946	1,039	+6.84%
1950	915	−3.13%
1964	611	−2.84%
1971	579	−0.77%
1981	492	−1.62%
1985	480	−0.62%
1989	453	−1.44%
1990	446	−1.55%
1991	436	−2.24%
1992	428	−1.83%
1993	424	−0.93%
1994	456	+7.55%
1995	470	+3.07%
1996	484	+2.98%

Year	Pop.	±% p.a.
1997	494	+2.07%
1998	504	+2.02%
1999	519	+2.98%
2000	521	+0.39%
2001	530	+1.73%
2002	551	+3.96%
2003	545	−1.09%
2004	542	−0.55%
2005	537	−0.92%
2006	541	+0.74%
2007	536	−0.92%
2008	525	−2.05%
2009	506	−3.62%
2010	503	−0.59%
2011	481	−4.37%
2012	473	−1.66%
2013	474	+0.21%
2014	477	+0.63%
2015	478	+0.21%
2016	473	−1.05%
