= Temnitz =

- Amt
- Map of Ostprignitz-Ruppin highlighting Temnitz
- Interactive map of Temnitz
- Location within Germany Location within Brandenburg
- Coordinates: 52°56′N 12°40′E
- Country: Germany
- State: Brandenburg
- District: Ostprignitz-Ruppin
- Seat: Walsleben
- Subdivisions: 6 municipalities

Area
  - Total: 249.69 km^{2} (96.41 sq mi)

Population (2025-12-31)
  - Total: 5,370
  - Density: 21.5/km^{2} (55.7/sq mi)
- Time zone: UTC+01:00 (CET)
  - Summer (DST): UTC+02:00 (CEST)
- Website: www.amt-temnitz.de

Amt Temnitz is an Amt ("collective municipality") in the district of Ostprignitz-Ruppin, in Brandenburg, Germany. Its seat is in Walsleben. Its name refers to the river Temnitz, a tributary of the Rhin.

The Amt Temnitz consists of the following municipalities:

1. Dabergotz
2. Märkisch Linden
3. Storbeck-Frankendorf
4. Temnitzquell
5. Temnitztal
6. Walsleben

== Demography ==
Development of population since 1875 within the current Boundaries (Blue Line: Population; Dotted Line: Comparison to Population development in Brandenburg state; Grey Background: Time of Nazi Germany; Red Background: Time of communist East Germany)

Recent Population Development and Projections (Population Development before Census 2011 (blue line); Recent Population Development according to the Census in Germany in 2011 (blue bordered line); Official projections for 2005-2030 (yellow line); for 2017-2030 (scarlet line); for 2020-2030 (green line)

Amt Temnitz: Population development
within the current boundaries (2020)

Year	Pop.	±% p.a.
1875	7,412	—
1890	7,509	+0.09%
1910	6,798	−0.50%
1925	7,105	+0.29%
1939	6,677	−0.44%
1950	10,356	+4.07%
1964	7,202	−2.56%
1971	6,975	−0.46%
1981	6,003	−1.49%

Year	Pop.	±% p.a.
1985	5,918	−0.36%
1990	5,760	−0.54%
1995	5,699	−0.21%
2000	5,874	+0.61%
2005	5,724	−0.52%
2010	5,478	−0.87%
2015	5,284	−0.72%
2020	5,479	+0.73%
2025	5,370	−0.40%
