= Walsleben =

- Municipality
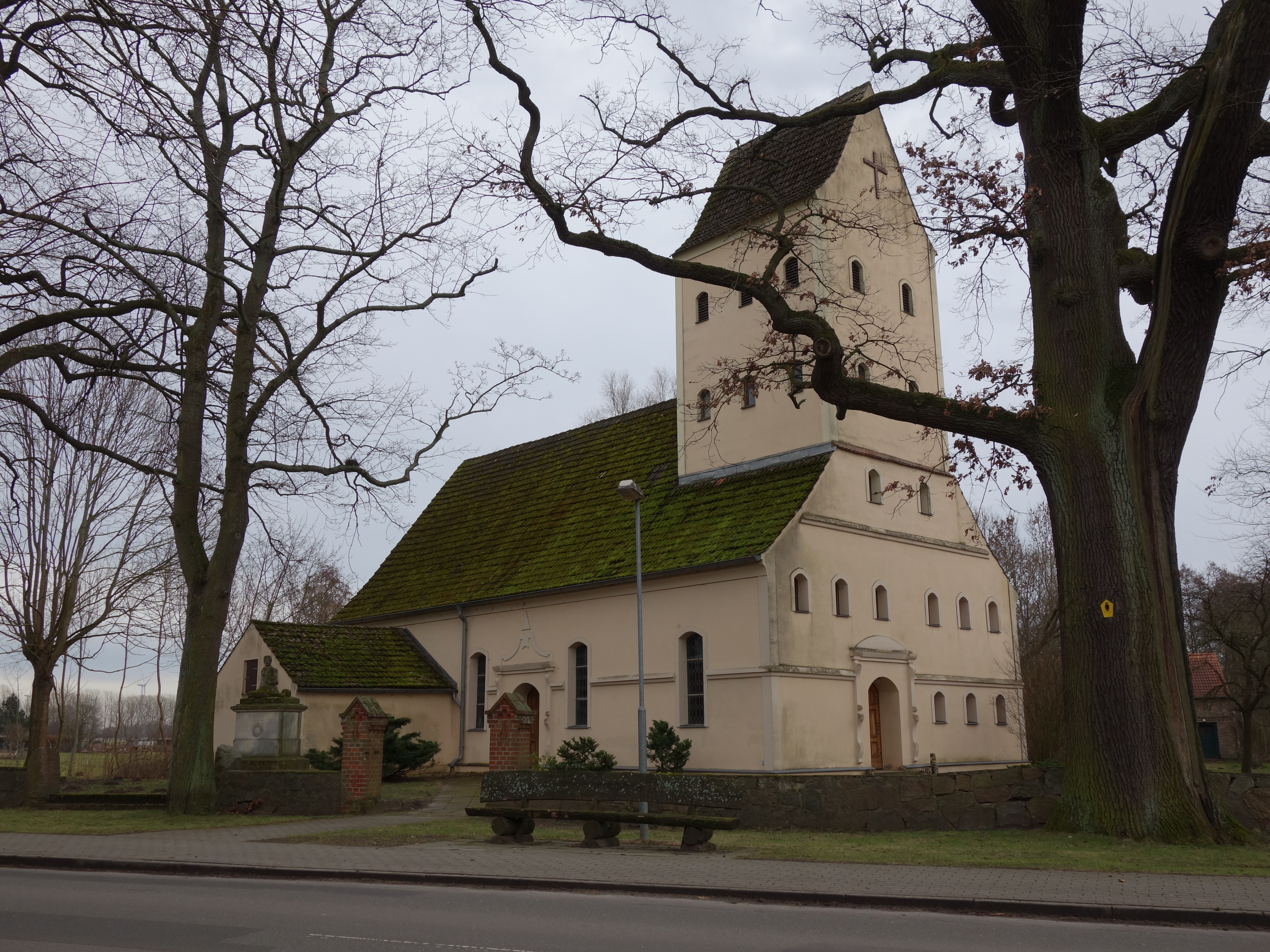
- Village church

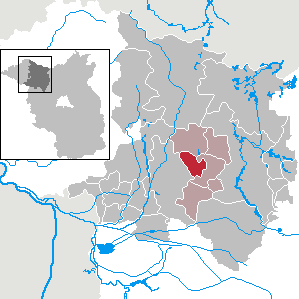
- Location of Walsleben within Ostprignitz-Ruppin district
- Interactive map of Walsleben
- Location within Germany Location within Brandenburg
- Coordinates: 52°55′59″N 12°40′00″E
- Country: Germany
- State: Brandenburg
- District: Ostprignitz-Ruppin
- Municipal assoc.: Temnitz

Government
  - Mayor (2024–29): Matthias Kupper

Area
  - Total: 31.78 km^{2} (12.27 sq mi)
- Elevation: 44 m (144 ft)

Population (2025-12-31)
  - Total: 794
  - Density: 25.0/km^{2} (64.7/sq mi)
- Time zone: UTC+01:00 (CET)
  - Summer (DST): UTC+02:00 (CEST)
- Postal codes: 16818
- Dialling codes: 033920
- Vehicle registration: OPR
- Website: www.amt-temnitz.de

Walsleben is a municipality in the Ostprignitz-Ruppin district, in Brandenburg, Germany.

== Demography ==
Development of population since 1875 within the current boundaries (Blue line: Population; Dotted line: Comparison to population development of Brandenburg state; Grey background: Time of Nazi rule; Red background: Time of communist rule)

Walsleben: Population development
within the current boundaries (2013)

Year	Pop.	±% p.a.
1875	678	—
1890	863	+1.62%
1910	792	−0.43%
1925	892	+0.80%
1933	817	−1.09%
1939	797	−0.41%
1946	1,283	+7.04%
1950	1,205	−1.56%
1964	906	−2.02%
1971	834	−1.18%
1981	821	−0.16%
1985	889	+2.01%
1989	934	+1.24%
1990	907	−2.89%
1991	898	−0.99%
1992	900	+0.22%
1993	913	+1.44%
1994	915	+0.22%
1995	922	+0.77%
1996	929	+0.76%
1997	947	+1.94%

Year	Pop.	±% p.a.
1998	929	−1.90%
1999	950	+2.26%
2000	932	−1.89%
2001	913	−2.04%
2002	884	−3.18%
2003	842	−4.75%
2004	845	+0.36%
2005	831	−1.66%
2006	828	−0.36%
2007	817	−1.33%
2008	799	−2.20%
2009	784	−1.88%
2010	783	−0.13%
2011	821	+4.85%
2012	824	+0.37%
2013	797	−3.28%
2014	806	+1.13%
2015	812	+0.74%
2016	793	−2.34%
2017	786	−0.88%
2018	771	−1.91%
