= Dabergotz =

- Municipality
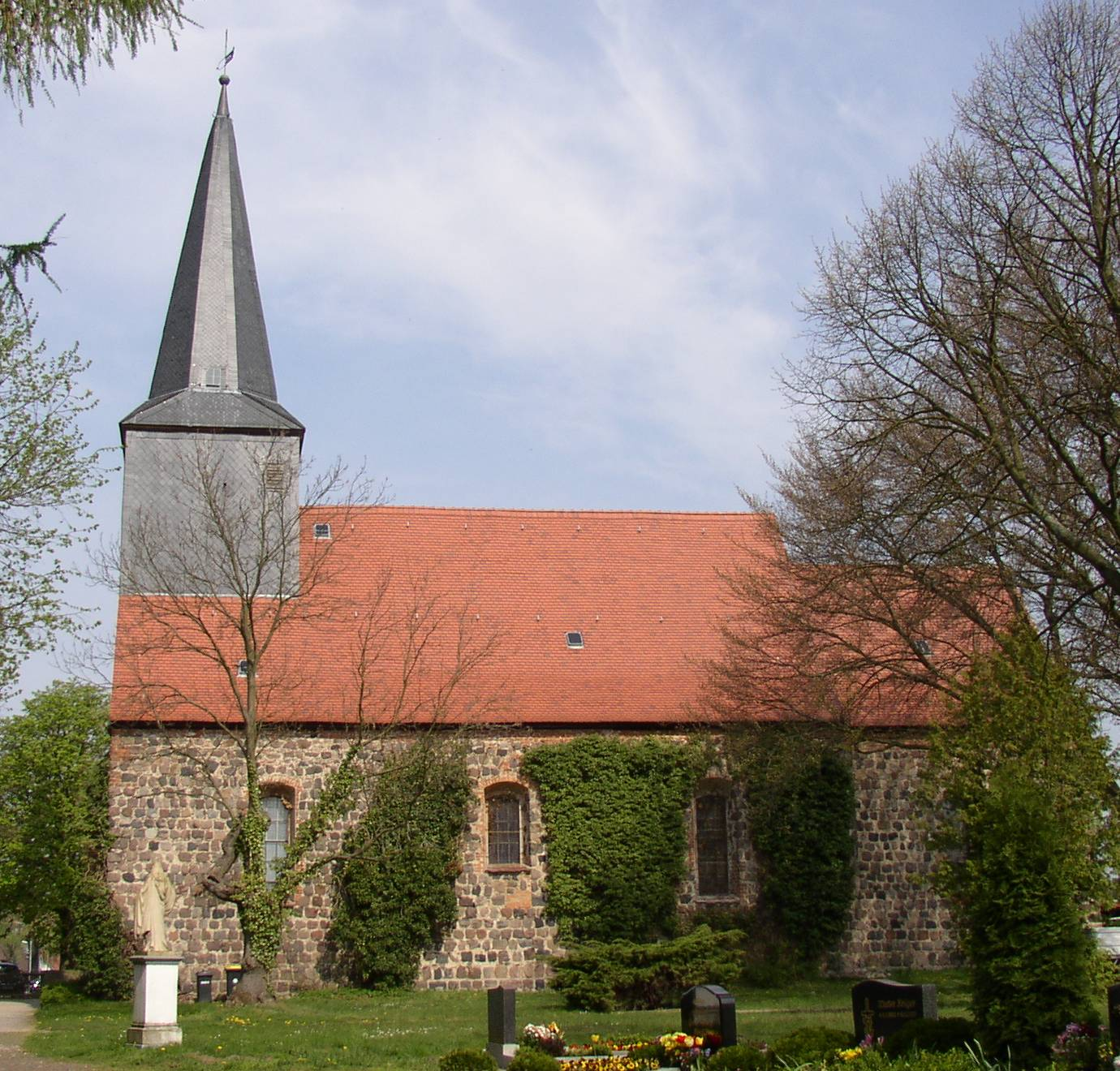
- Church

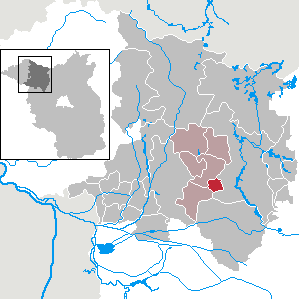
- Location of Dabergotz within Ostprignitz-Ruppin district
- Interactive map of Dabergotz
- Location within Germany Location within Brandenburg
- Coordinates: 52°54′N 12°44′E
- Country: Germany
- State: Brandenburg
- District: Ostprignitz-Ruppin
- Municipal assoc.: Temnitz

Government
  - Mayor (2024–29): Philipp Gotscha (CDU)

Area
  - Total: 12.59 km^{2} (4.86 sq mi)
- Elevation: 43 m (141 ft)

Population (2025-12-31)
  - Total: 659
  - Density: 52.3/km^{2} (136/sq mi)
- Time zone: UTC+01:00 (CET)
  - Summer (DST): UTC+02:00 (CEST)
- Postal codes: 16818
- Dialling codes: 03391
- Vehicle registration: OPR
- Website: www.amt-temnitz.de

Dabergotz is a municipality in the Ostprignitz-Ruppin district, in Brandenburg, Germany.

== History ==
From 1815 to 1945, Dabergotz was part of the Prussian Province of Brandenburg. From 1952 to 1990, it was part of the Bezirk Potsdam of East Germany.

== Demography ==
Development of population since 1875 within the current boundaries (Blue line: Population; Dotted line: Comparison to population development of Brandenburg state; Grey background: Time of Nazi rule; Red background: Time of communist rule)

Dabergotz: Population development
within the current boundaries (2013)

| Year | Pop. | ±% p.a. |
|---|---|---|
| 1875 | 407 | — |
| 1890 | 426 | +0.30% |
| 1910 | 416 | −0.12% |
| 1925 | 449 | +0.51% |
| 1933 | 429 | −0.57% |
| 1939 | 438 | +0.35% |
| 1946 | 852 | +9.97% |
| 1950 | 771 | −2.47% |
| 1964 | 623 | −1.51% |
| 1971 | 663 | +0.89% |
| 1981 | 574 | −1.43% |
| 1985 | 546 | −1.24% |
| 1989 | 534 | −0.55% |
| 1990 | 520 | −2.62% |
| 1991 | 524 | +0.77% |
| 1992 | 515 | −1.72% |
| 1993 | 529 | +2.72% |
| 1994 | 529 | +0.00% |
| 1995 | 523 | −1.13% |
| 1996 | 525 | +0.38% |

| Year | Pop. | ±% p.a. |
|---|---|---|
| 1997 | 541 | +3.05% |
| 1998 | 564 | +4.25% |
| 1999 | 581 | +3.01% |
| 2000 | 592 | +1.89% |
| 2001 | 588 | −0.68% |
| 2002 | 622 | +5.78% |
| 2003 | 608 | −2.25% |
| 2004 | 614 | +0.99% |
| 2005 | 605 | −1.47% |
| 2006 | 616 | +1.82% |
| 2007 | 614 | −0.32% |
| 2008 | 590 | −3.91% |
| 2009 | 596 | +1.02% |
| 2010 | 590 | −1.01% |
| 2011 | 613 | +3.90% |
| 2012 | 599 | −2.28% |
| 2013 | 601 | +0.33% |
| 2014 | 603 | +0.33% |
| 2015 | 599 | −0.66% |
| 2016 | 611 | +2.00% |
