= Lüttow-Valluhn =

- Municipality
- Location of Lüttow-Valluhn within Ludwigslust-Parchim district
- Interactive map of Lüttow-Valluhn
- Location within Germany Location within Mecklenburg-Vorpommern
- Coordinates: 53°31′N 10°53′E
- Country: Germany
- State: Mecklenburg-Vorpommern
- District: Ludwigslust-Parchim
- Municipal assoc.: Zarrentin
- Subdivisions: 4

Government
  - Mayor: Marko Schilling

Area
  - Total: 24.30 km^{2} (9.38 sq mi)
- Elevation: 44 m (144 ft)

Population (2025-12-31)
  - Total: 821
  - Density: 33.8/km^{2} (87.5/sq mi)
- Time zone: UTC+01:00 (CET)
  - Summer (DST): UTC+02:00 (CEST)
- Postal codes: 19246
- Dialling codes: 038851
- Vehicle registration: LWL
- Website: www.zarrentin.de

Lüttow-Valluhn is a municipality in the Ludwigslust-Parchim district, in Mecklenburg-Vorpommern, Germany.
