= Gallin =

- Municipality
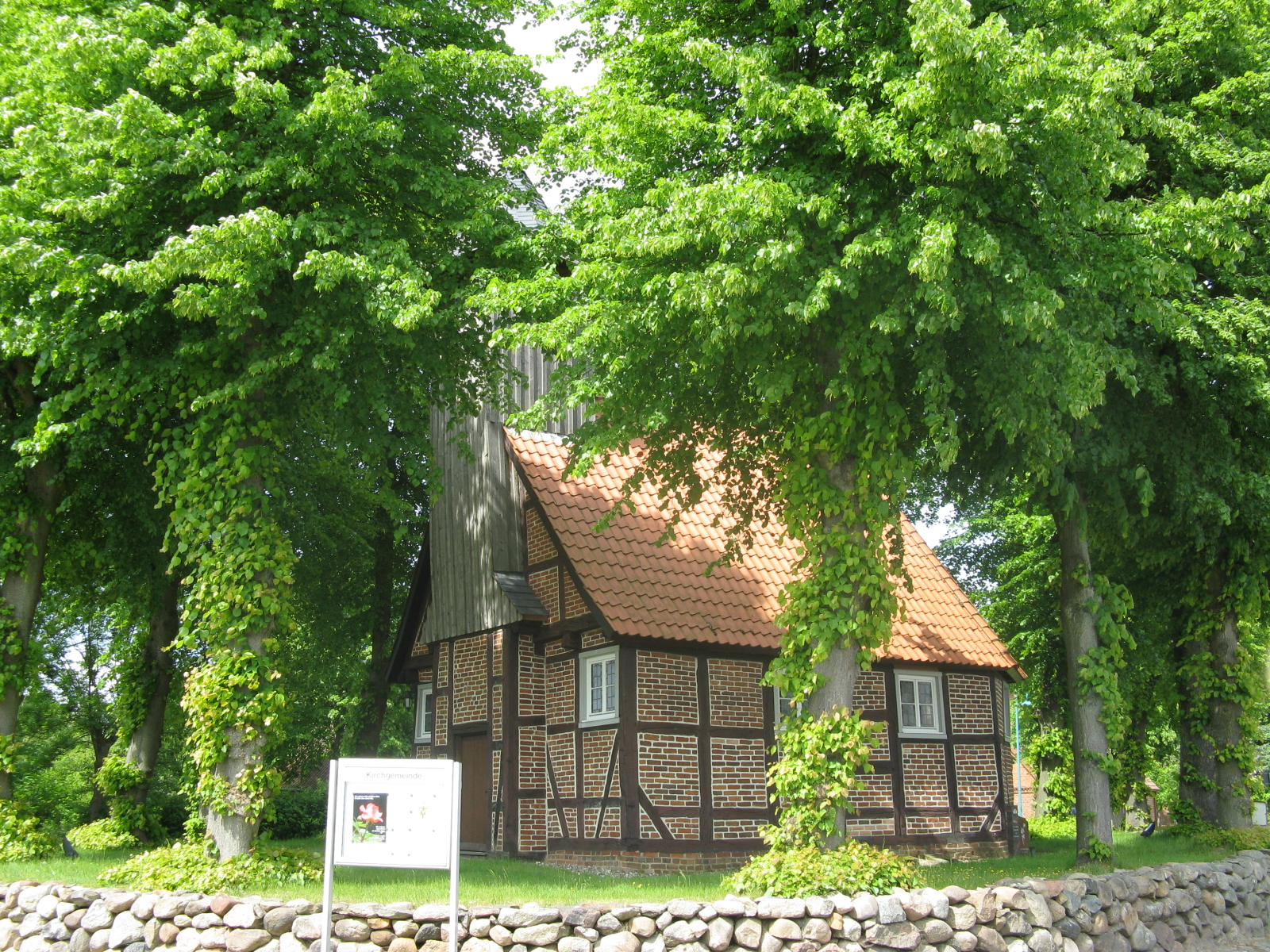
- Village church in Gallin

- Coat of arms

- Location of Gallin within Ludwigslust-Parchim district
- Interactive map of Gallin
- Location within Germany Location within Mecklenburg-Vorpommern
- Coordinates: 53°30′N 10°49′E
- Country: Germany
- State: Mecklenburg-Vorpommern
- District: Ludwigslust-Parchim
- Municipal assoc.: Zarrentin
- Subdivisions: 4

Government
  - Mayor: Klaus-Dieter Müller

Area
  - Total: 22.71 km^{2} (8.77 sq mi)
- Elevation: 53 m (174 ft)

Population (2025-12-31)
  - Total: 562
  - Density: 24.7/km^{2} (64.1/sq mi)
- Time zone: UTC+01:00 (CET)
  - Summer (DST): UTC+02:00 (CEST)
- Postal codes: 19258
- Dialling codes: 038842, 038843, 038851
- Vehicle registration: LWL
- Website: www.gemeinde-gallin.de

Gallin is a municipality in the Ludwigslust-Parchim district, in Mecklenburg-Vorpommern, Germany.

== See also ==
- Uri Gallin (1928–2021), Israeli Olympic discus thrower
