= Heiligengrabe =

- Municipality
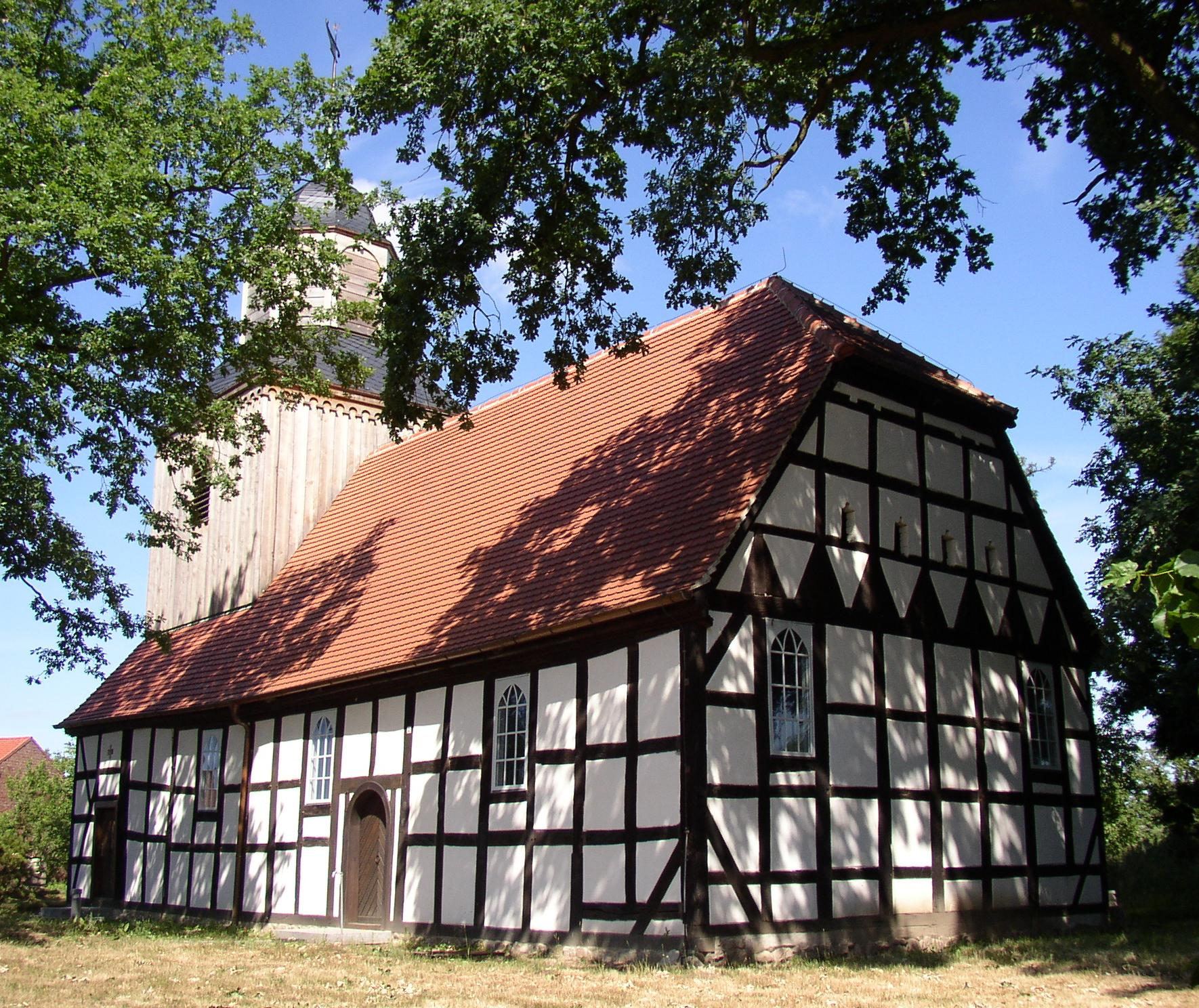
- Church in Grabow

- Coat of arms

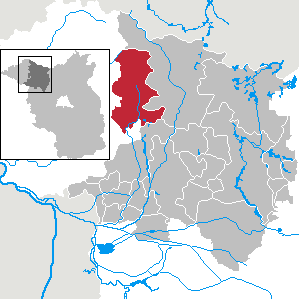
- Location of Heiligengrabe within Ostprignitz-Ruppin district
- Interactive map of Heiligengrabe
- Location within Germany Location within Brandenburg
- Coordinates: 53°09′N 12°21′E
- Country: Germany
- State: Brandenburg
- District: Ostprignitz-Ruppin
- Subdivisions: 14 Ortsteile

Government
  - Mayor (2023–31): Karl-Friedrich Schült

Area
  - Total: 232.30 km^{2} (89.69 sq mi)
- Elevation: 75 m (246 ft)

Population (2025-12-31)
  - Total: 4,302
  - Density: 18.52/km^{2} (47.96/sq mi)
- Time zone: UTC+01:00 (CET)
  - Summer (DST): UTC+02:00 (CEST)
- Postal codes: 16909
- Dialling codes: 033962
- Vehicle registration: OPR
- Website: www.heiligengrabe.de

Heiligengrabe is a municipality in the Ostprignitz-Ruppin district, in Brandenburg, Germany.

== Geography ==
The municipality counts 13 villages (Ortsteil): Blandikow, Blesendorf, Blumenthal, Grabow bei Blumenthal, Herzsprung, Jabel, Königsberg, Liebenthal, Maulbeerwalde, Papenbruch, Rosenwinkel, Wernikow and Zaatzke.

== History ==
From 1815 to 1945, Heiligengrabe was part of the Prussian Province of Brandenburg. From 1952 to 1990, it was part of the Bezirk Potsdam of East Germany.

== Architecture ==
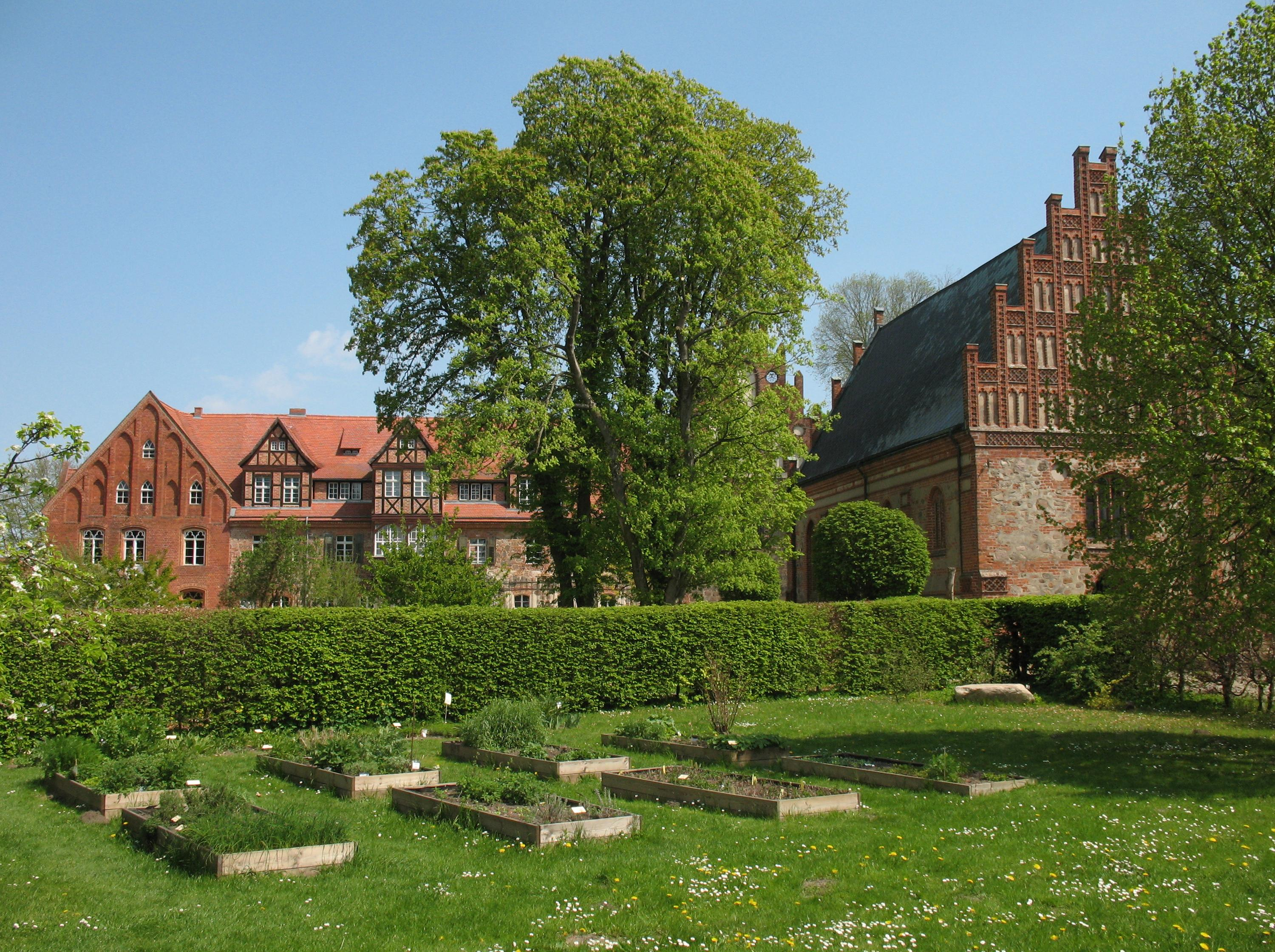
Herb garden, Convent building and Blood Chapel

=== Abbey ===
Heiligengrabe Abbey (literally in English: Holy Sepulchre; formerly also known as Techow) was founded here as a Cistercian nunnery in 1289 by Heinrich, Bishop of Havelberg and the Margrave Otto of Brandenburg, initially for 12 nuns. It held an important relic in the form of a Bleeding Host which, so it was said, had been violated in a host desecration by a Jew.

The nunnery acquired considerable wealth and estates in the area, partly through the revenue from pilgrims to the Bleeding Host, and partly through donations from the noble families round about, especially when one of their daughters entered the convent. Among the nuns of local great houses were members of the families Gans zu Putlitz, von Quitzow, von Rohr, von Winterfeld and von Blumenthal. Some of the abbesses were great characters. The Abbess Henriette von Winterfeldt had a quarrel with the Duke of Mecklenburg, who refused to pay a debt to the abbey. So she borrowed a large artillery piece and declared war on Mecklenburg, bombarding it across the nearby frontier. At the time of the Lutheran Reformation, Abbess Anna von Quitzow would have nothing to do with the new denomination, and refused to pay tax.

After the Reformation the prior function of the nunnery, to provide sustenance for unmarried women mostly from local noble families, wasn't to be given up with its secularisation. So the formerly Roman Catholic nunnery turned into a Lutheran women's convent (German: das Stift, more particular: Damenstift (in German), literally in English: Ladies' foundation), with its conventuals now called secular canonesses (Stiftsdamen). The canonesses of nobility were obliged to show sixteen quarterings in their arms before being permitted to enter.

Abbey

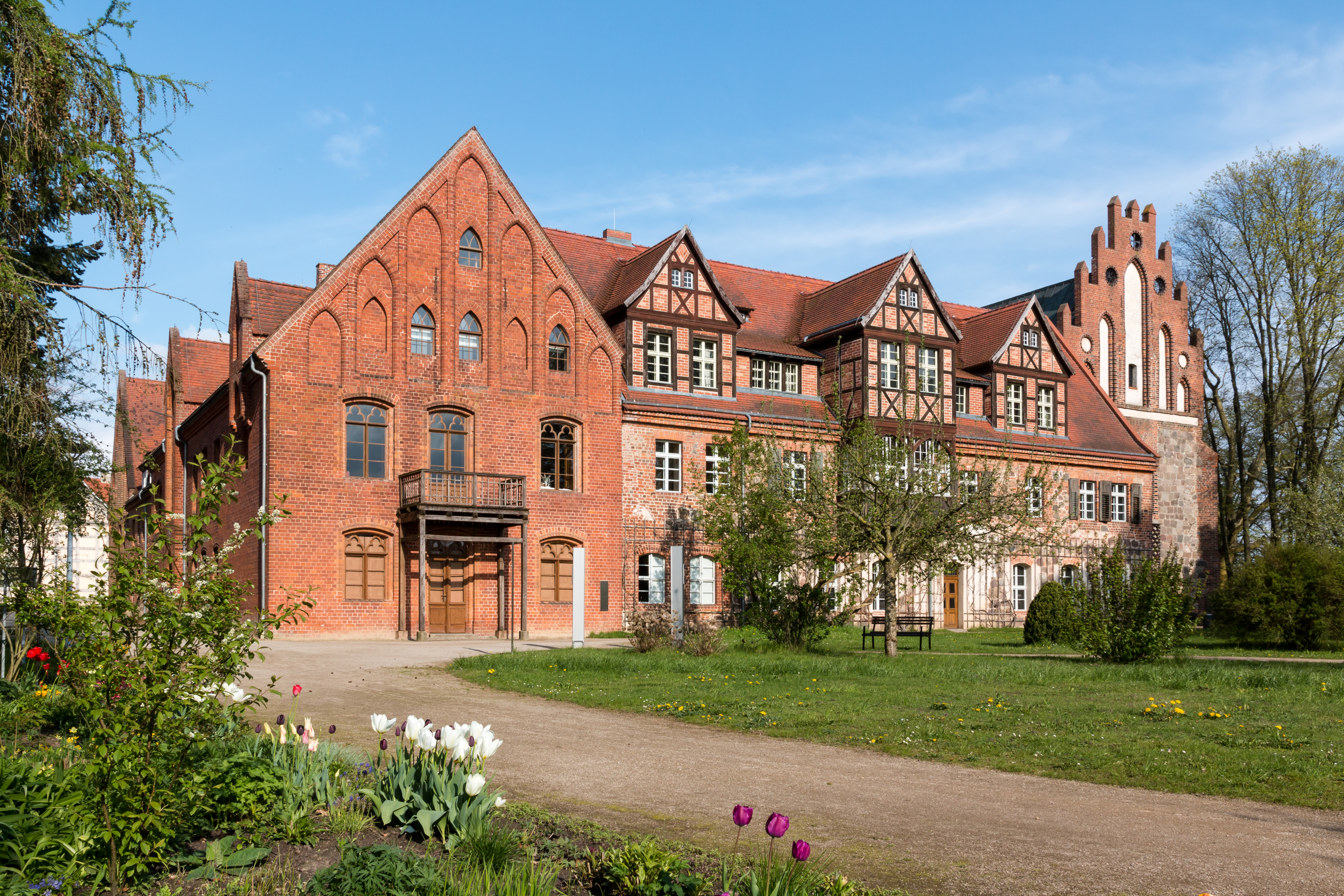
Convent building

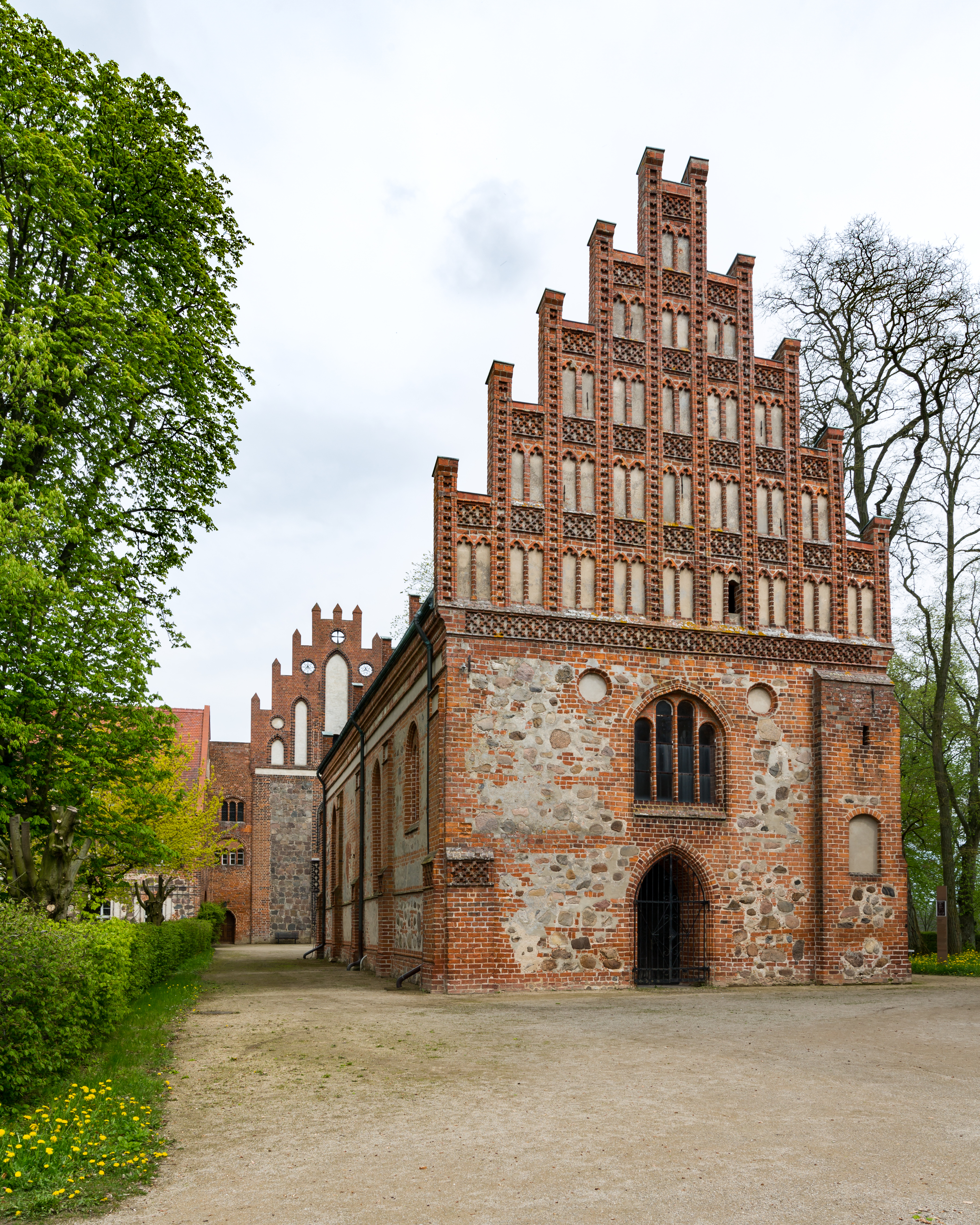
Blood Chapel

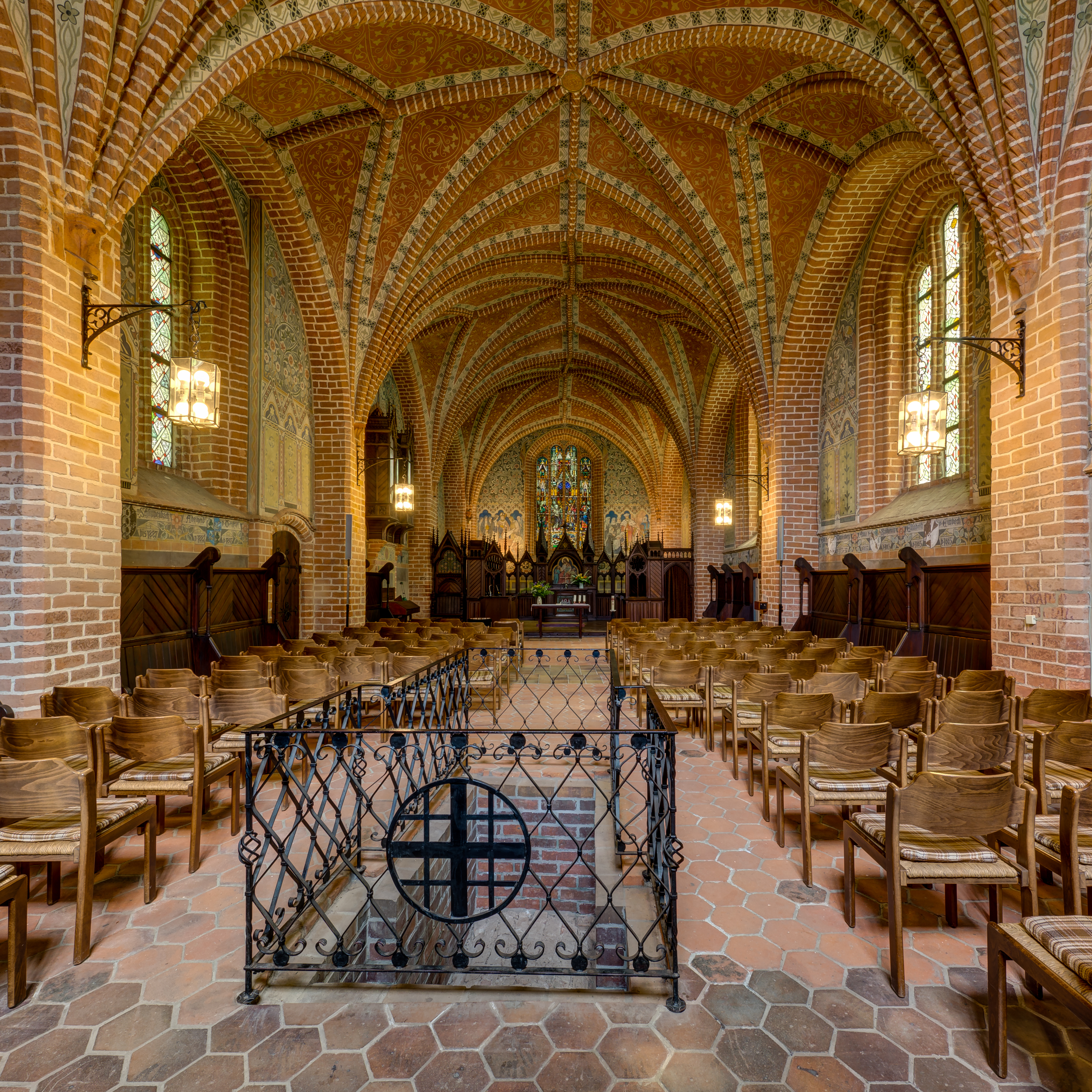
Interior of the Blood Chapel

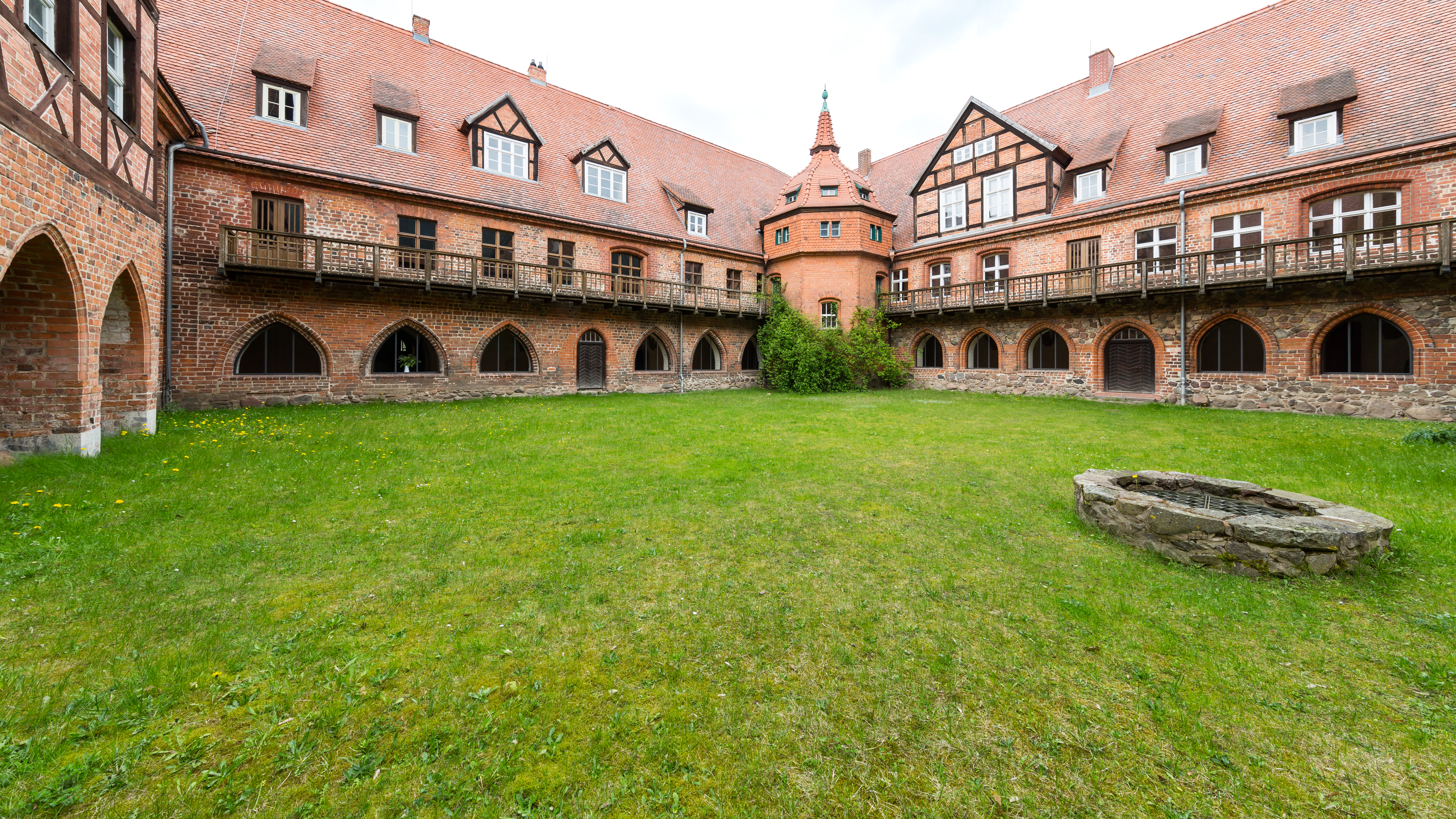
Cloister

=== Other infrastructures ===
In Heiligengrabe is the Blumenthal Observation Tower.

== Demography ==
Development of population since 1875 within the current Boundaries (Blue Line: Population; Dotted Line: Comparison to Population development in Brandenburg state; Grey Background: Time of Nazi Germany; Red Background: Time of communist East Germany)

Recent Population Development and Projections (Population Development before Census 2011 (blue line); Recent Population Development according to the Census in Germany in 2011 (blue bordered line); Official projections for 2005-2030 (yellow line); for 2017-2030 (scarlet line); for 2020-2030 (green line)

Heiligengrabe: Population development
within the current boundaries (2020)

Year	Pop.	±% p.a.
1875	6,413	—
1890	6,295	−0.12%
1910	6,135	−0.13%
1925	6,314	+0.19%
1939	6,029	−0.33%
1950	9,659	+4.38%
1964	7,201	−2.08%

Year	Pop.	±% p.a.
1971	6,783	−0.85%
1981	5,817	−1.52%
1985	5,624	−0.84%
1990	5,534	−0.32%
1995	5,245	−1.07%
2000	5,335	+0.34%
2005	5,087	−0.95%

Year	Pop.	±% p.a.
2010	4,693	−1.60%
2015	4,441	−1.10%
2016	4,426	−0.34%
2017	4,385	−0.93%
2018	4,399	+0.32%
2019	4,370	−0.66%
2020	4,379	+0.21%

== Gallery ==
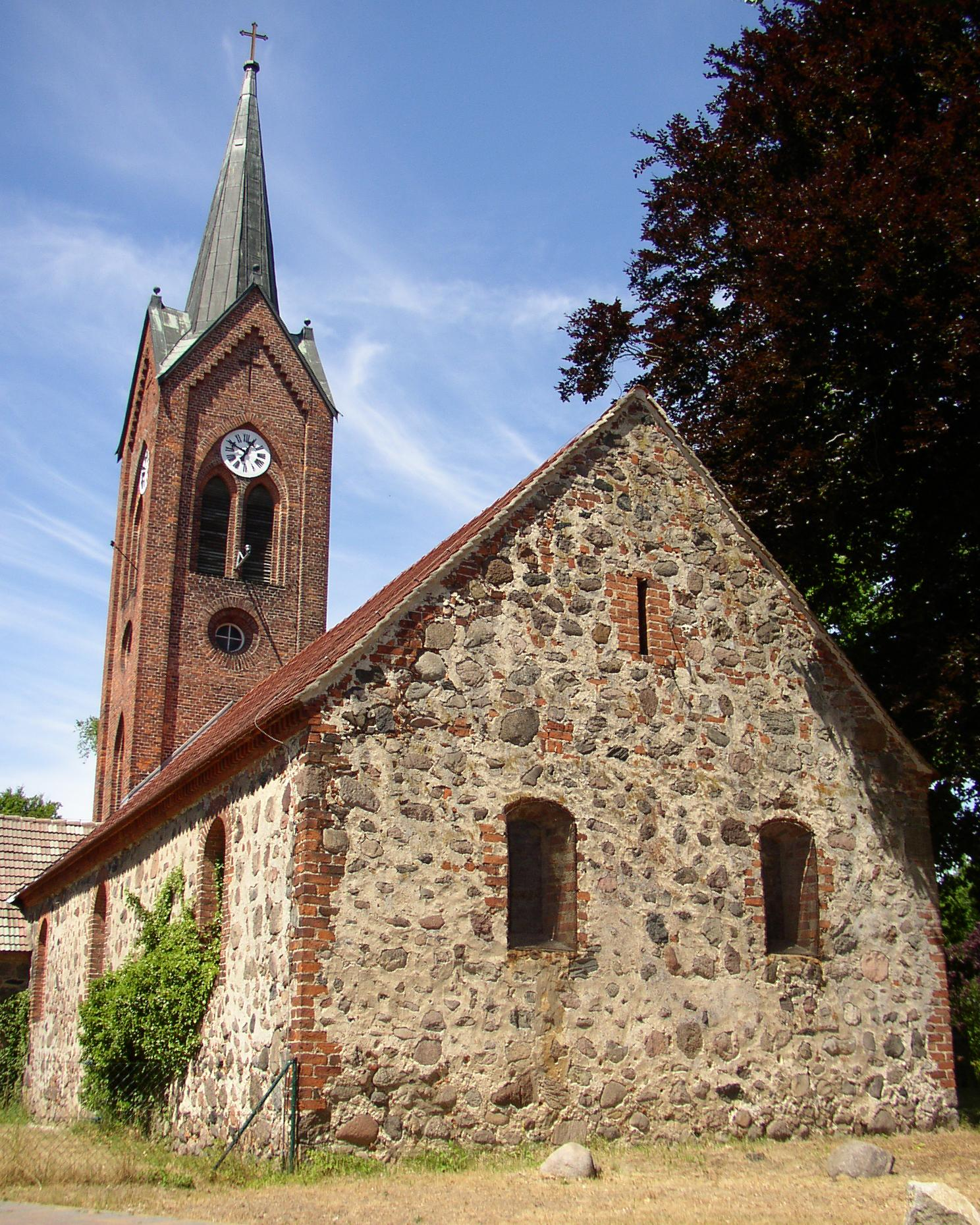
Church in Blumenthal

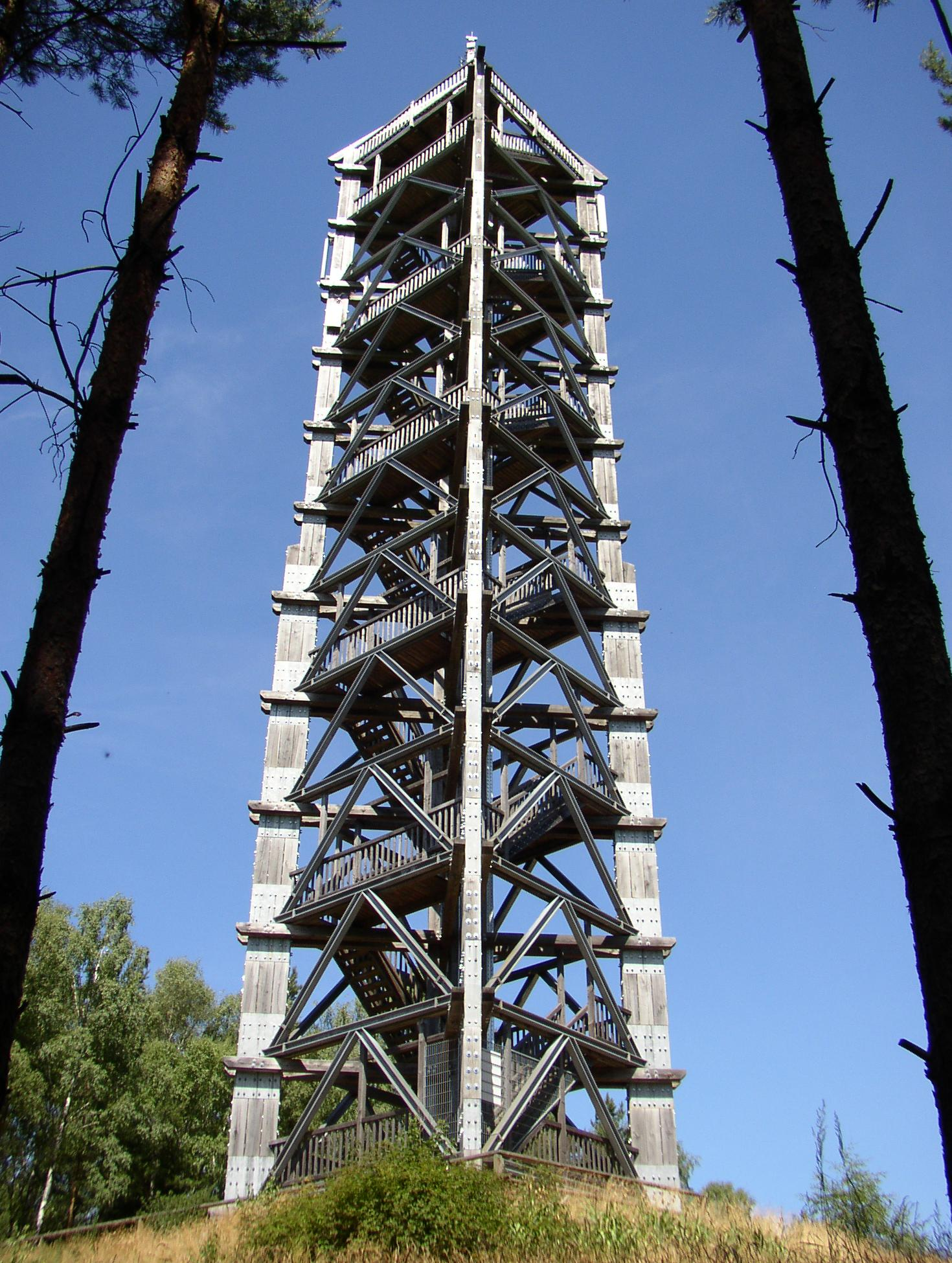
View tower in Blumenthal

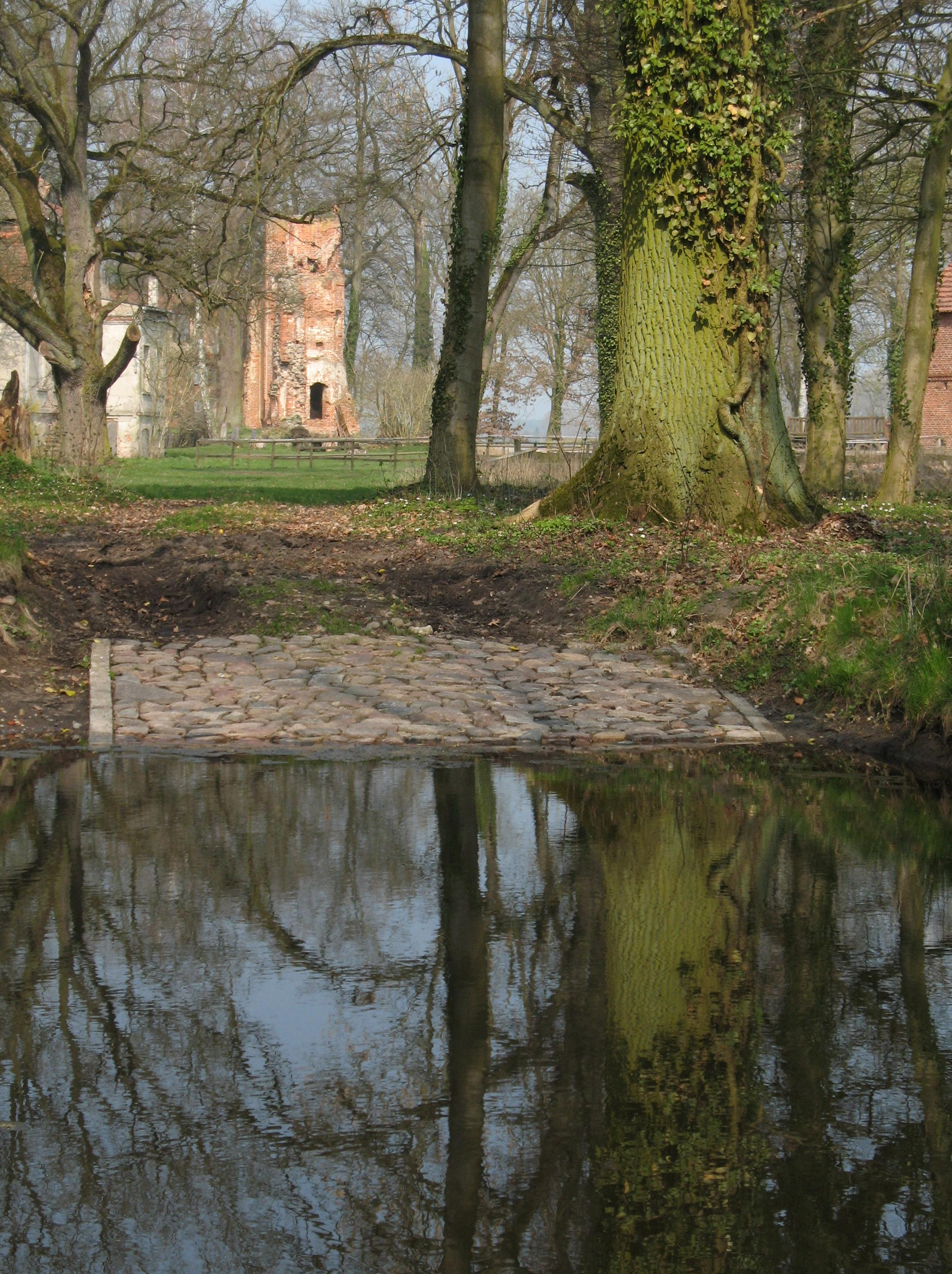
Palace grounds in Blumenthal-Horst

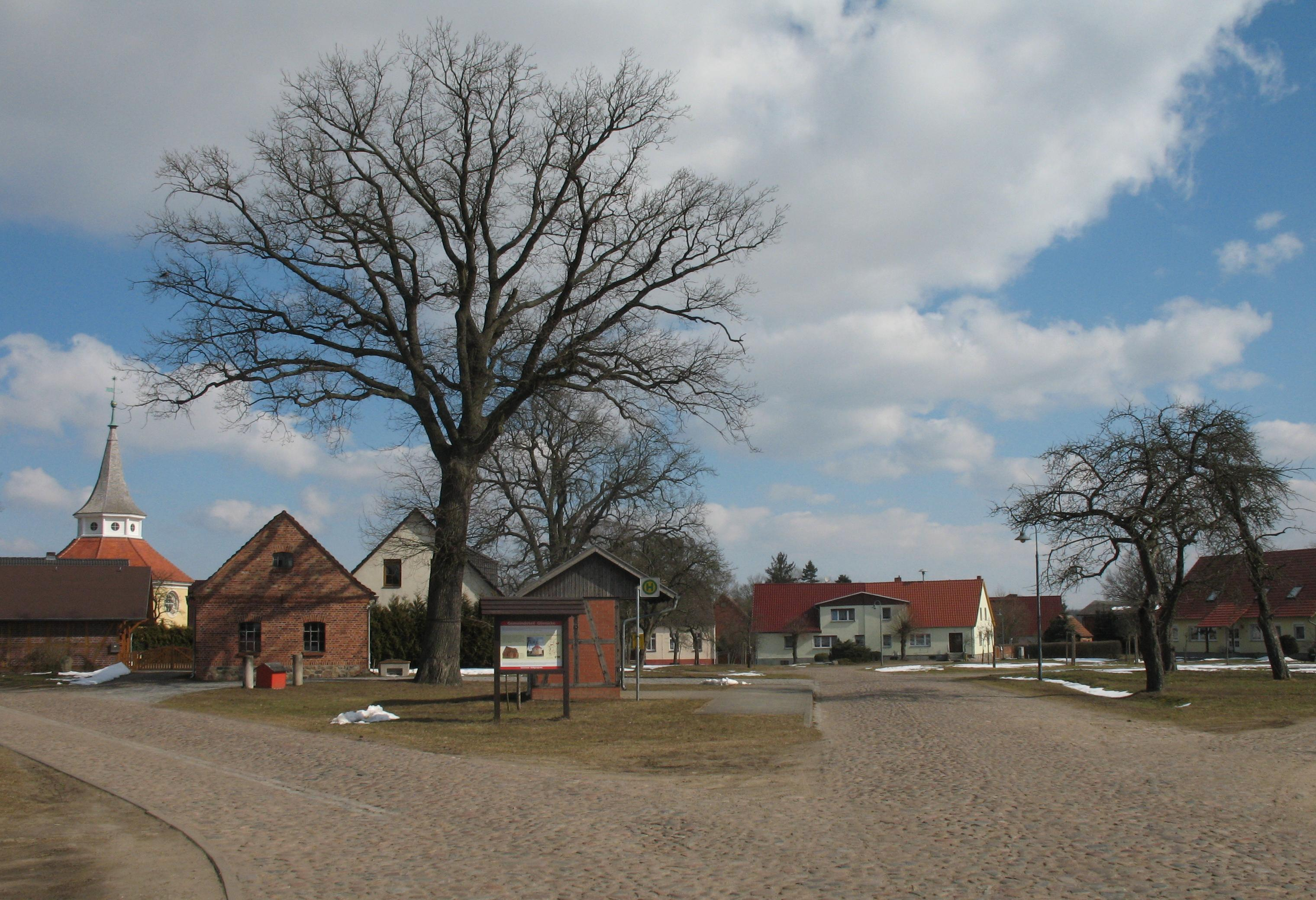
Rundling Glienicke

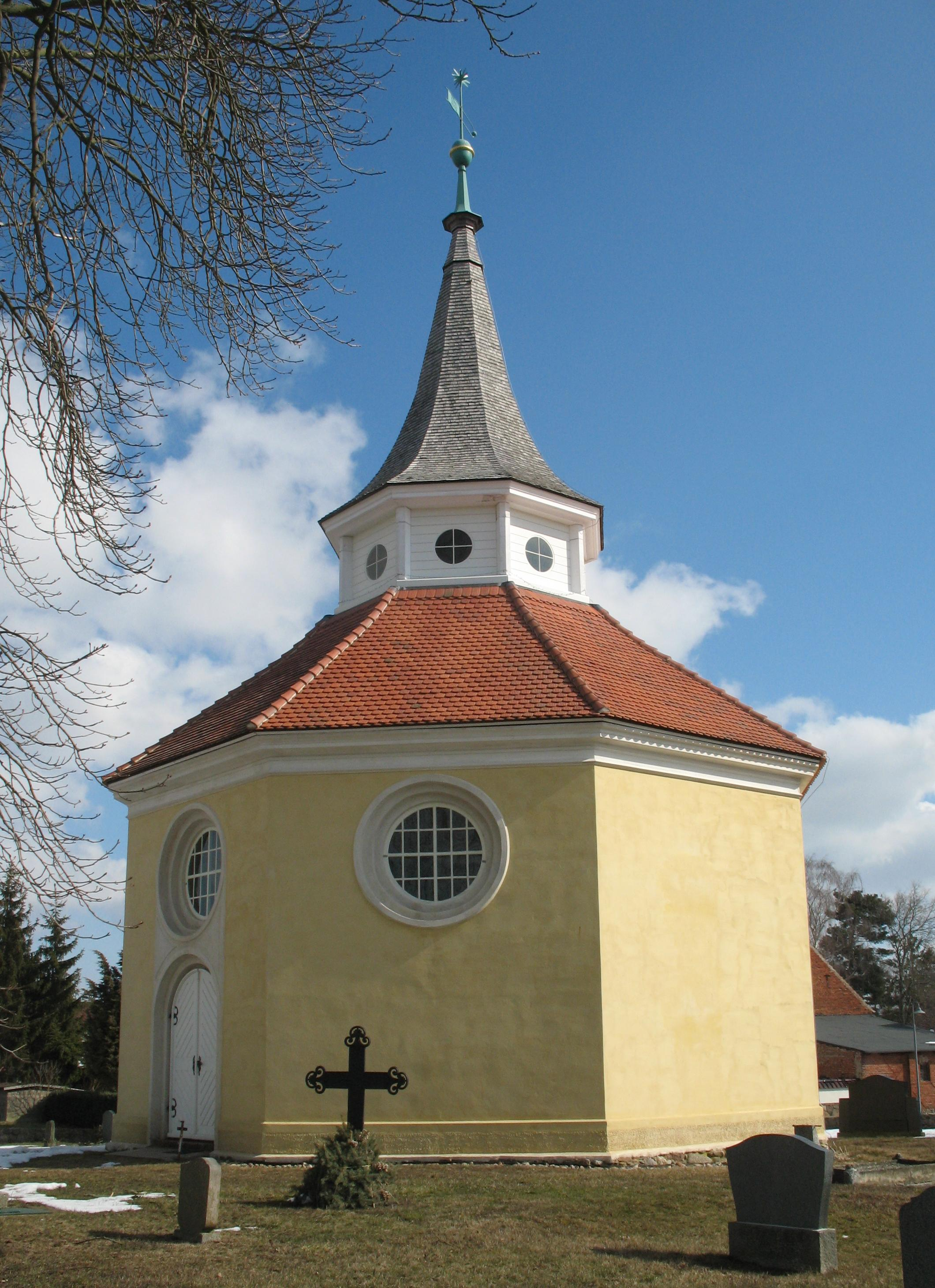
Church in Glienicke

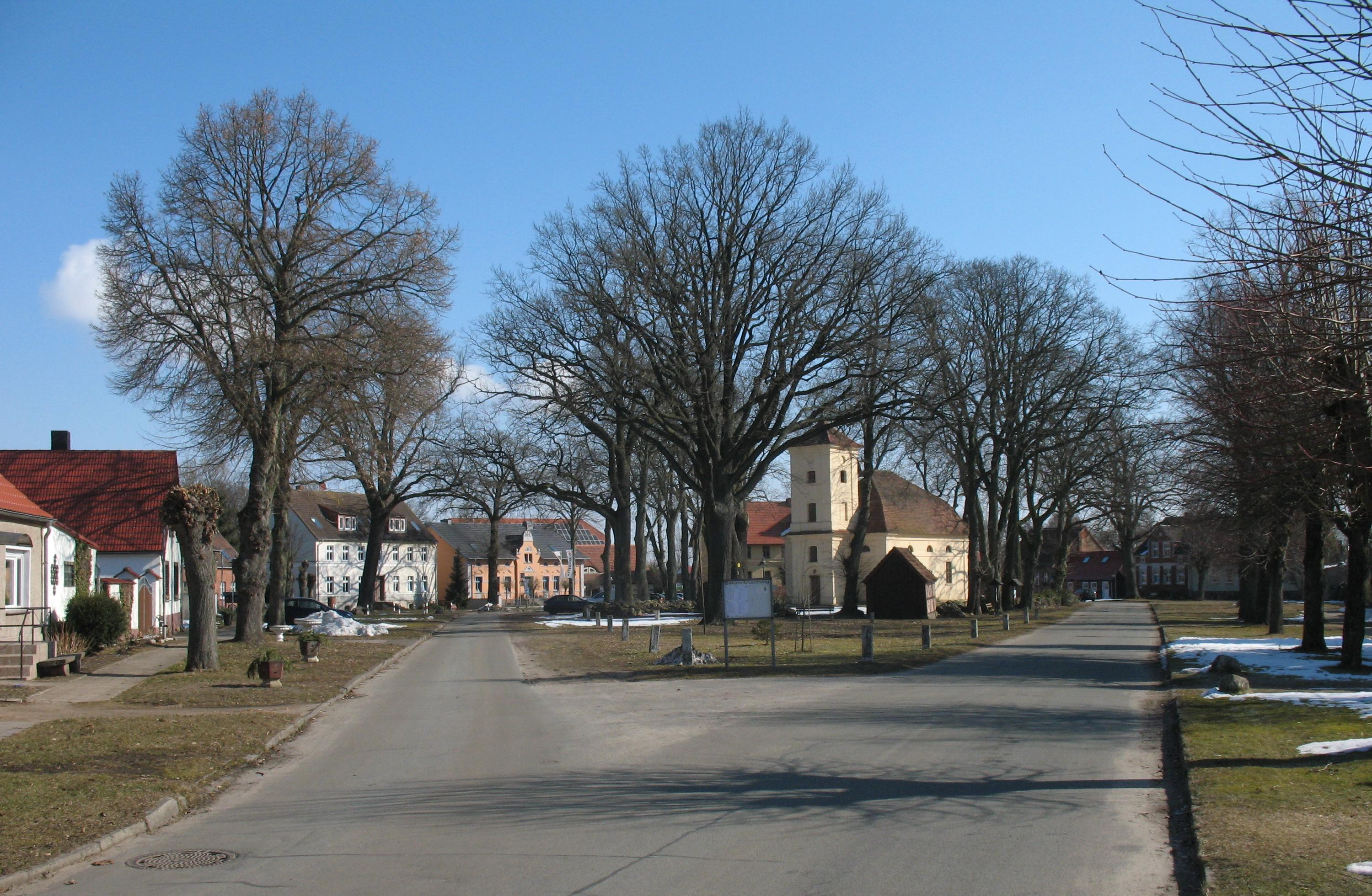
Rundling Jabel

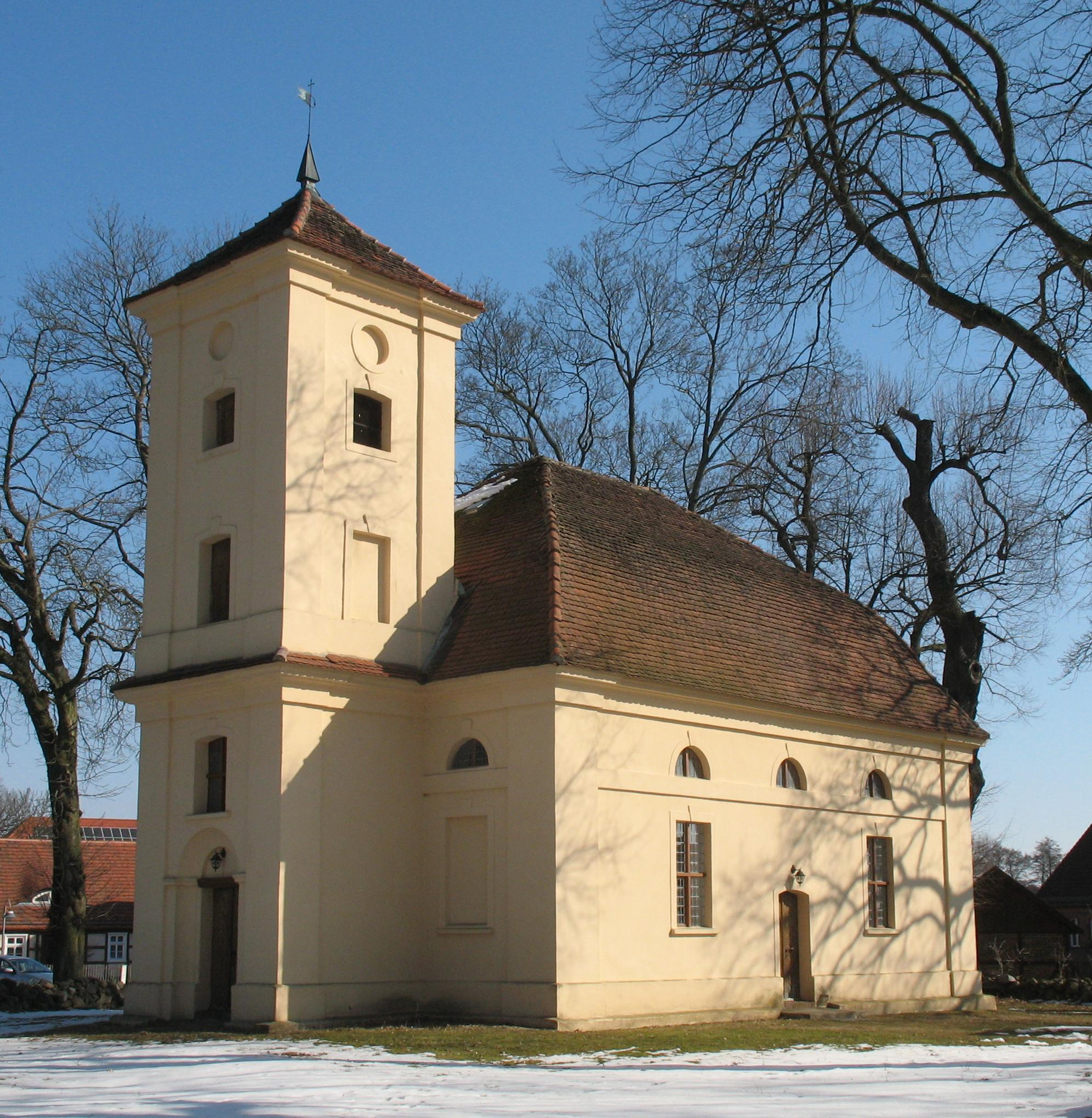
Church in Jabel

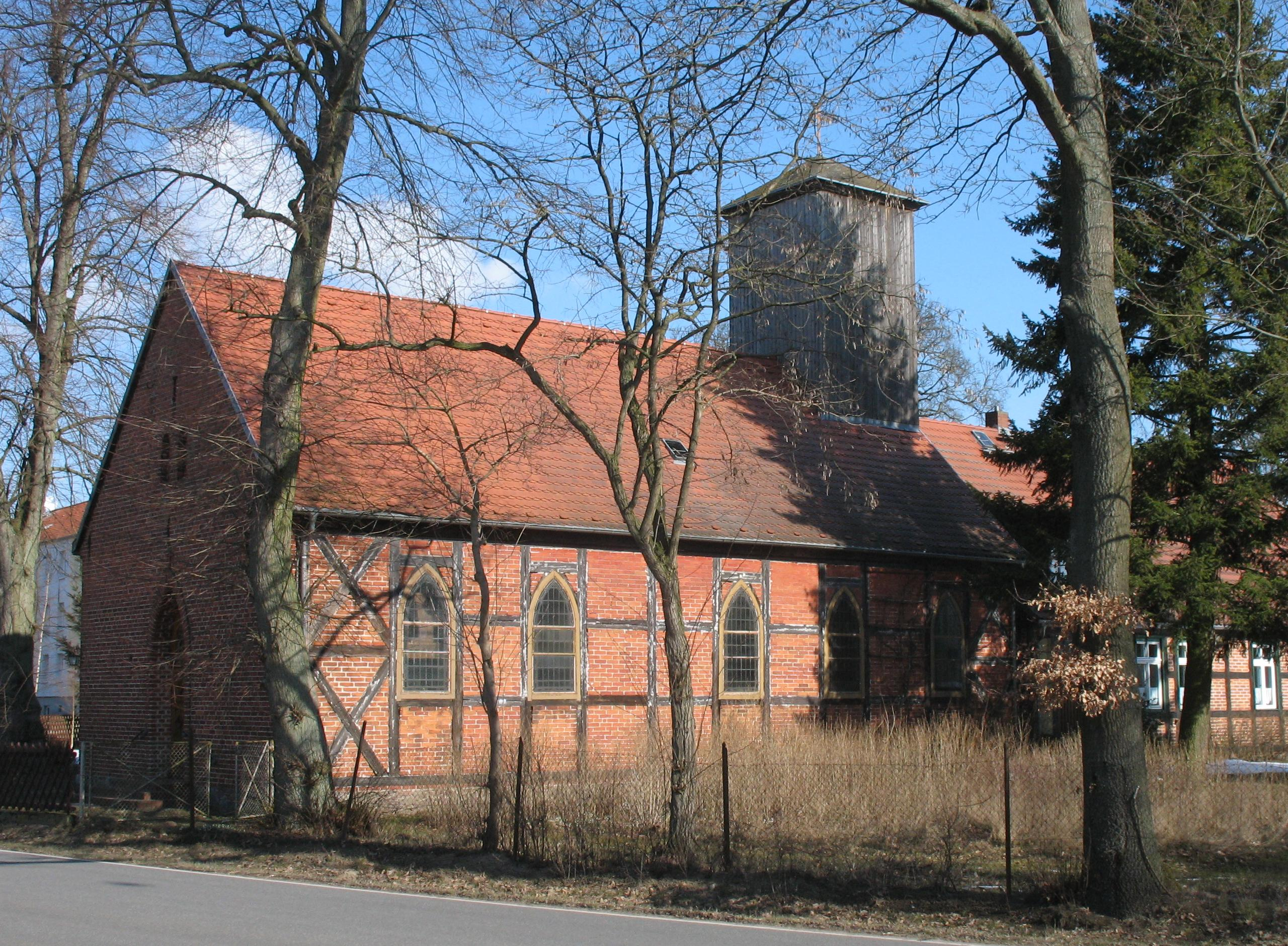
Church in Jabel

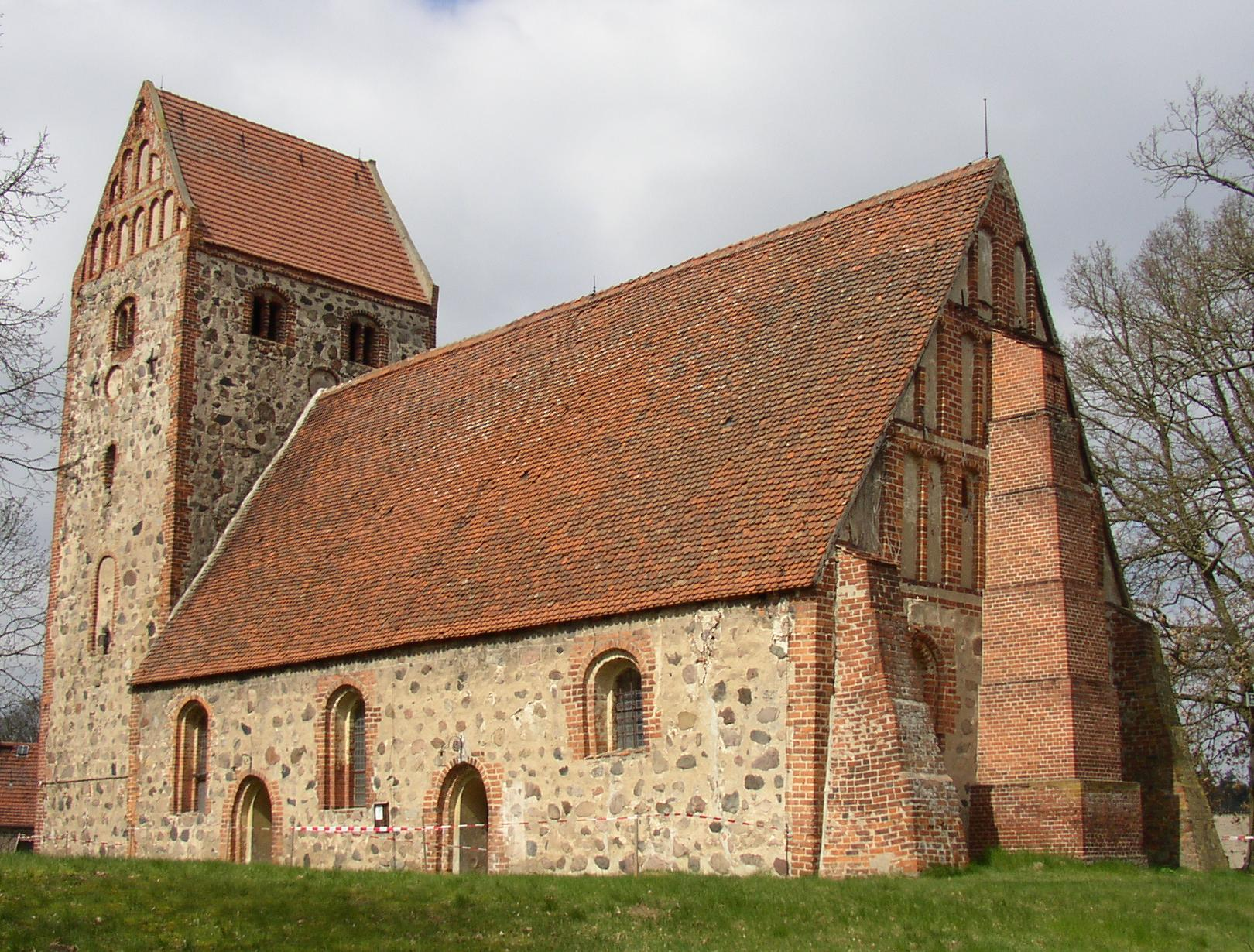
Church in Königsberg
