= Temnitzquell =

- Municipality
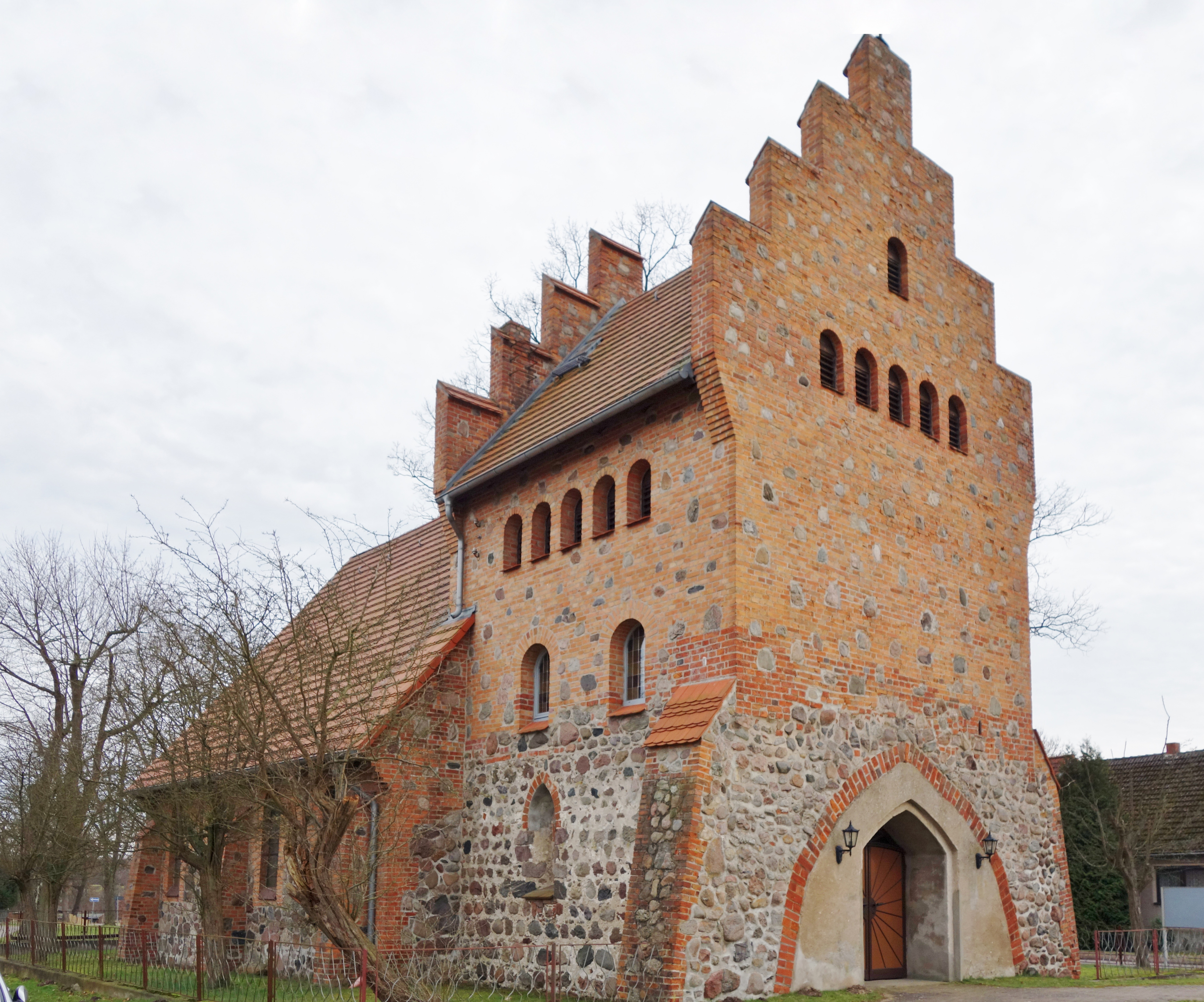
- Church in Katerbow

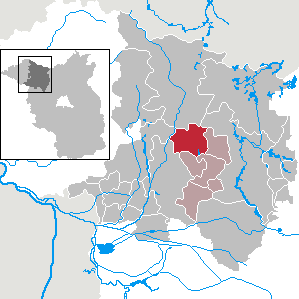
- Location of Temnitzquell within Ostprignitz-Ruppin district
- Interactive map of Temnitzquell
- Location within Germany Location within Brandenburg
- Coordinates: 53°00′52″N 12°38′54″E
- Country: Germany
- State: Brandenburg
- District: Ostprignitz-Ruppin
- Municipal assoc.: Temnitz

Government
  - Mayor (2024–29): Bernd Müller

Area
  - Total: 65.47 km^{2} (25.28 sq mi)
- Elevation: 60 m (200 ft)

Population (2025-12-31)
  - Total: 744
  - Density: 11.4/km^{2} (29.4/sq mi)
- Time zone: UTC+01:00 (CET)
  - Summer (DST): UTC+02:00 (CEST)
- Postal codes: 16818
- Dialling codes: 033924
- Vehicle registration: OPR

Temnitzquell is a municipality in the Ostprignitz-Ruppin district, in Brandenburg, Germany.

== Demography ==
Development of population since 1875 within the current boundaries (Blue line: Population; Dotted line: Comparison to population development of Brandenburg state; Grey background: Time of Nazi rule; Red background: Time of communist rule)

Temnitzquell: Population development
within the current boundaries (2013)

Year	Pop.	±% p.a.
1875	1,249	—
1890	1,280	+0.16%
1910	1,214	−0.26%
1925	1,187	−0.15%
1933	1,176	−0.12%
1939	1,217	+0.57%
1946	2,017	+7.48%
1950	1,783	−3.04%
1964	1,163	−3.01%
1971	1,088	−0.95%
1981	921	−1.65%
1985	908	−0.35%
1989	881	−0.75%
1990	897	+1.82%
1991	876	−2.34%
1992	860	−1.83%
1993	846	−1.63%
1994	857	+1.30%
1995	845	−1.40%
1996	853	+0.95%

Year	Pop.	±% p.a.
1997	858	+0.59%
1998	865	+0.82%
1999	875	+1.16%
2000	852	−2.63%
2001	848	−0.47%
2002	860	+1.42%
2003	867	+0.81%
2004	862	−0.58%
2005	857	−0.58%
2006	831	−3.03%
2007	821	−1.20%
2008	825	+0.49%
2009	819	−0.73%
2010	811	−0.98%
2011	786	−3.08%
2012	772	−1.78%
2013	761	−1.42%
2014	736	−3.29%
2015	756	+2.72%
2016	755	−0.13%
