= Hornbek =

- Municipality
- Coat of arms

- Location of Hornbek within Herzogtum Lauenburg district
- Interactive map of Hornbek
- Location within Germany Location within Schleswig-Holstein
- Coordinates: 53°34′N 10°38′E
- Country: Germany
- State: Schleswig-Holstein
- District: Herzogtum Lauenburg
- Municipal assoc.: Breitenfelde

Government
  - Mayor: Hermann Kröhnert

Area
  - Total: 5.89 km^{2} (2.27 sq mi)
- Elevation: 31 m (102 ft)

Population (2025-12-31)
  - Total: 197
  - Density: 33.4/km^{2} (86.6/sq mi)
- Time zone: UTC+01:00 (CET)
  - Summer (DST): UTC+02:00 (CEST)
- Postal codes: 21514
- Dialling codes: 04158
- Vehicle registration: RZ
- Website: www.amt-breitenfelde.de

Hornbek (German pronunciation: [ˈhɔʁnbeːk]) is a municipality in the district of Lauenburg, in Schleswig-Holstein, Germany.
