= Herzsprung =

Herzsprung is a Danish surname and German surname. Notable people with the surname include:

- Bernd Herzsprung (born 1942), German actor
- Ejnar Hertzsprung
- Hannah Herzsprung (born 1981), German actress, daughter of Bernd
