= Wöbbelin concentration camp =

Nazi concentration camp in Ludwigslust, Germany

Coordinates: 53°22′1″N 11°29′31″E

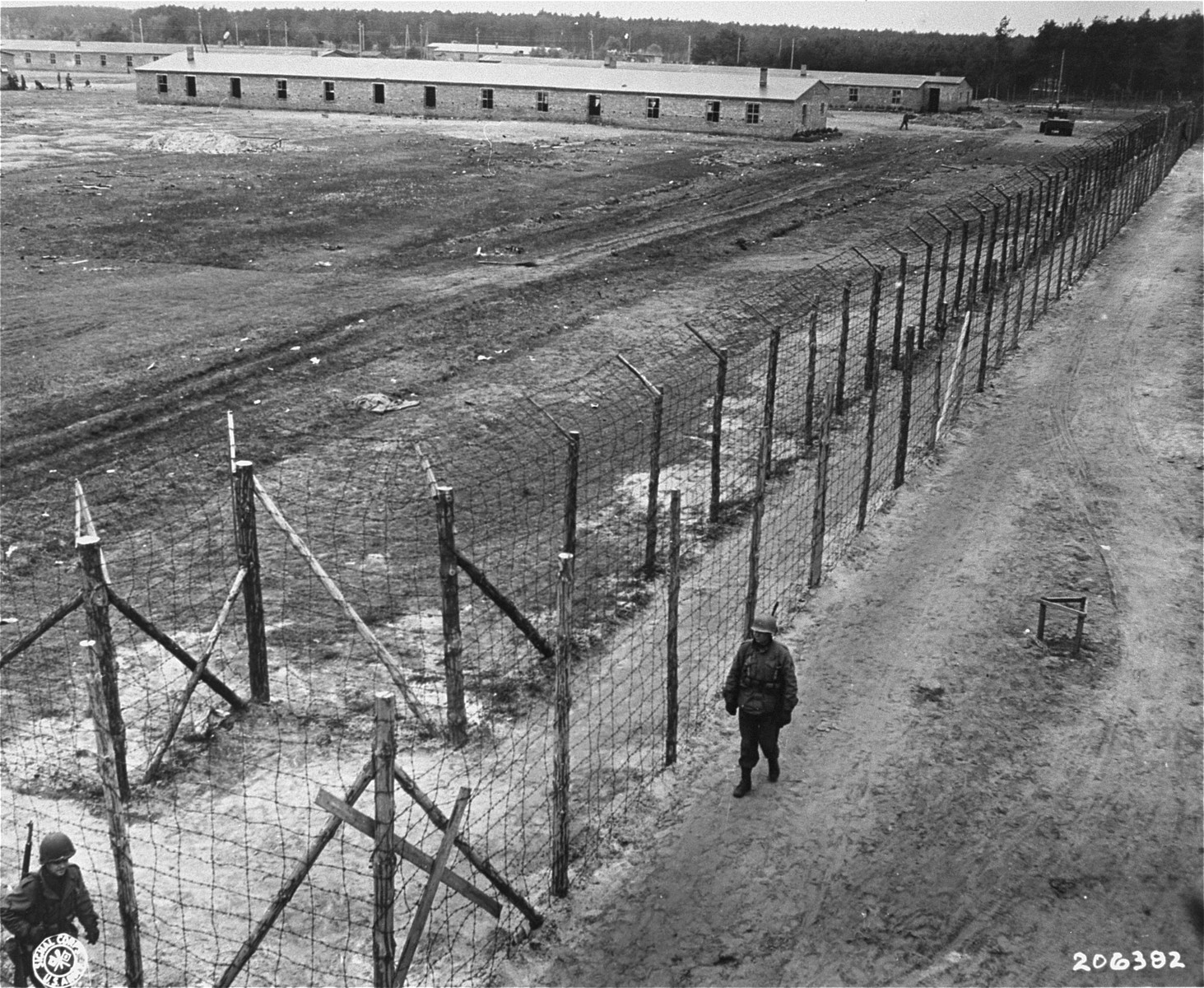
American soldiers patrol the perimeter of the newly liberated Wöbbelin concentration camp

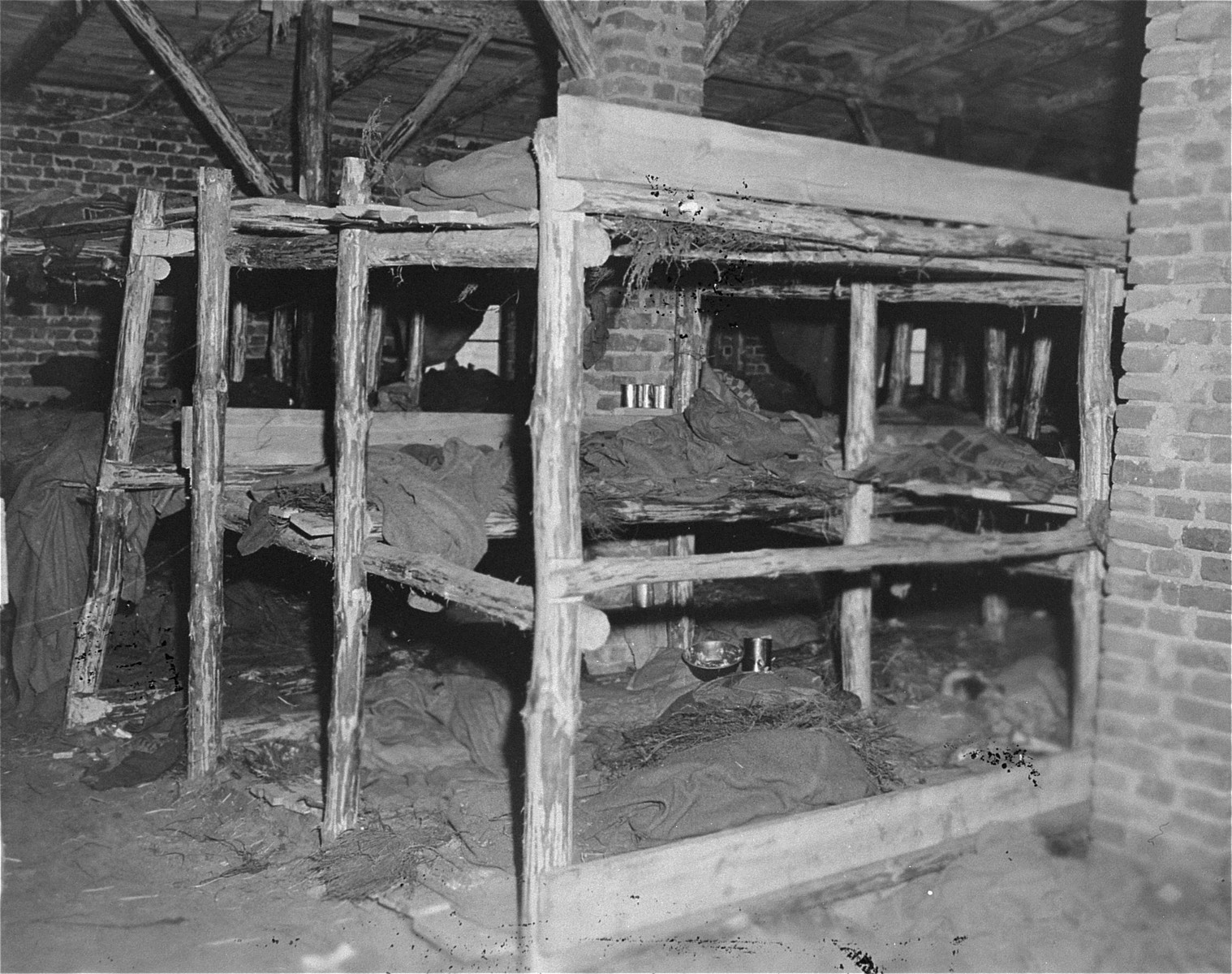
Bunks in the barracks

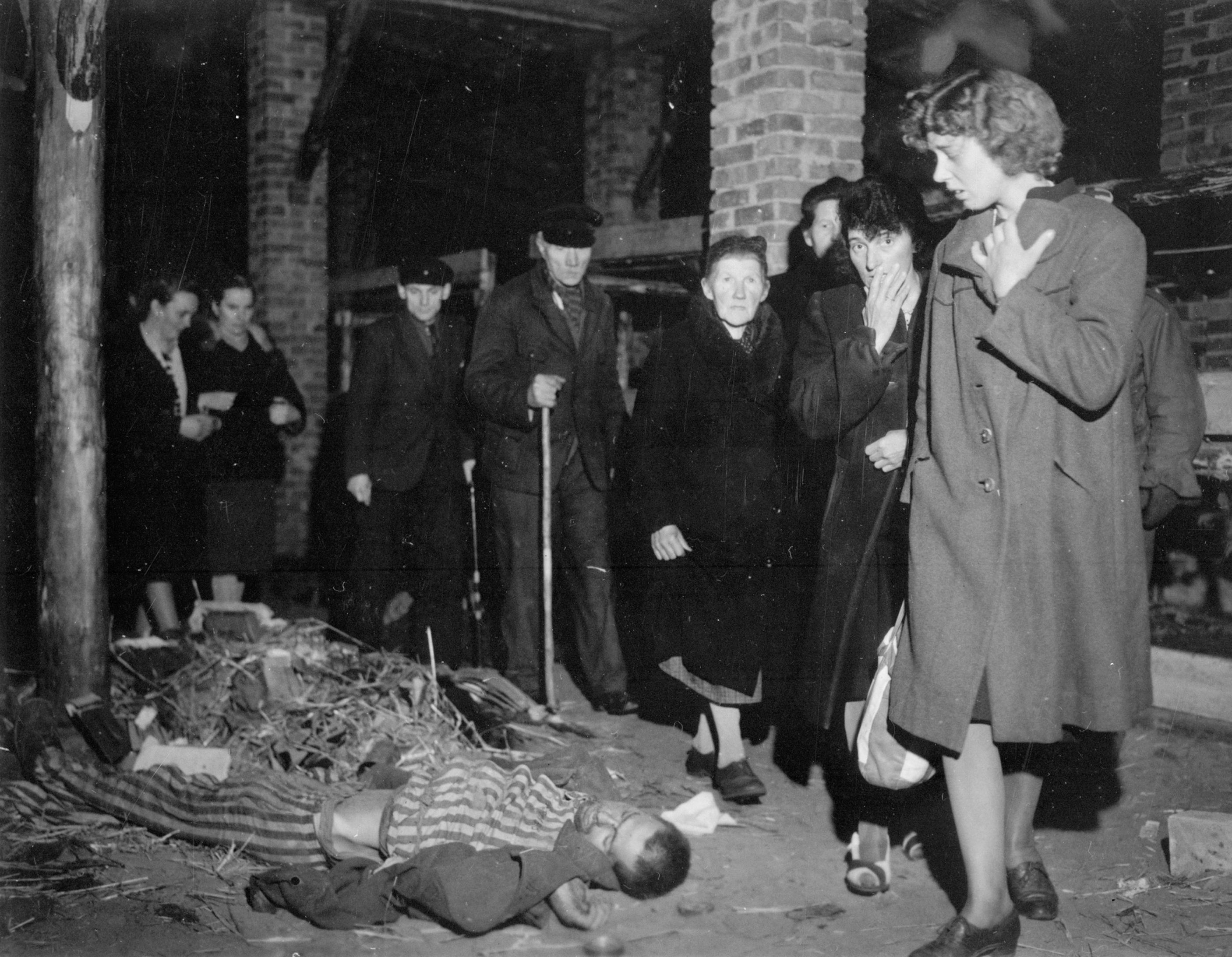
Citizens of Ludwigslust inspect the concentration camp under orders of the 82nd Airborne Division

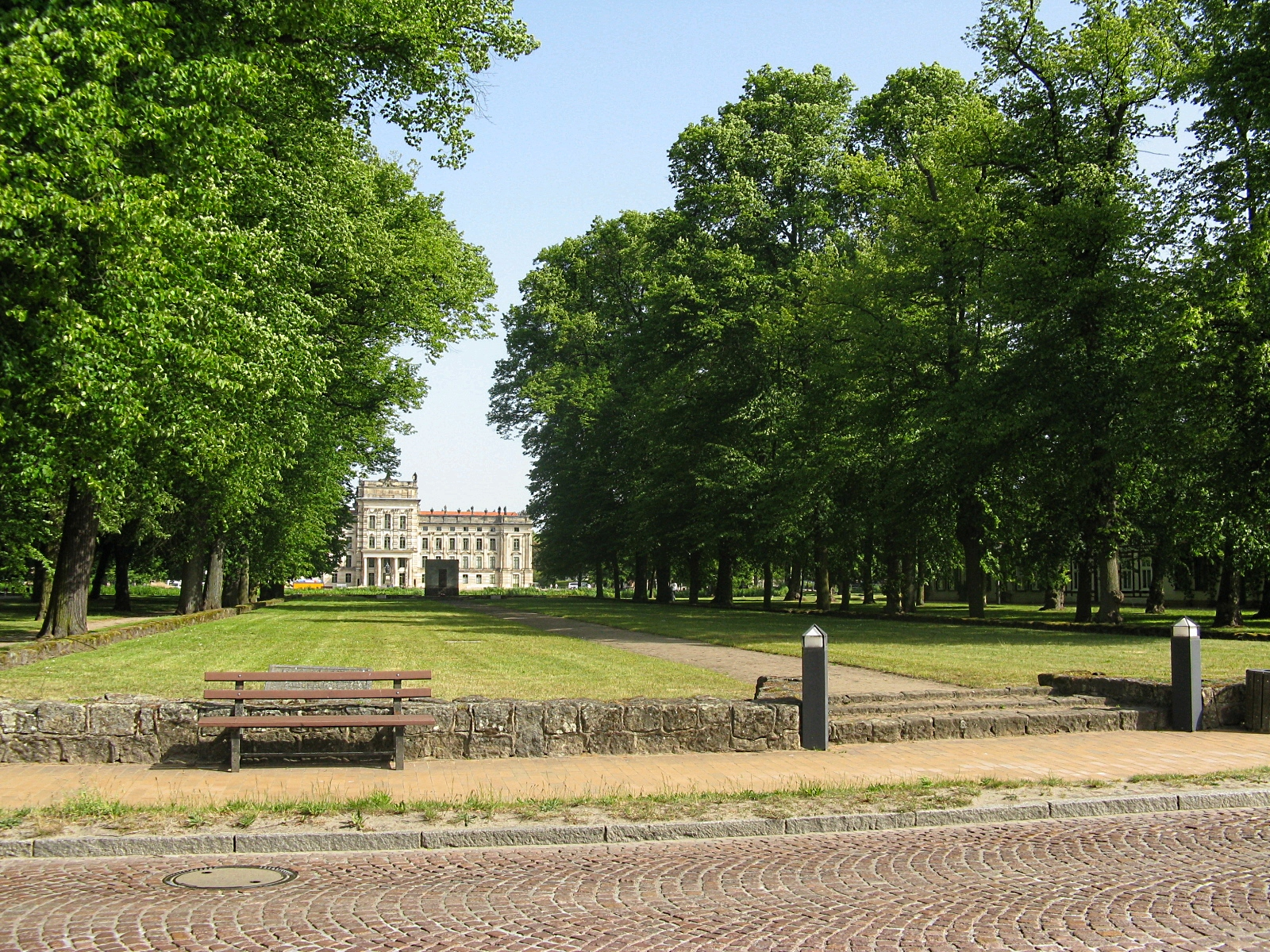
The Ludwigslust Palace garden front from the axial Hofdamenallee, a memorial and grave field for 200 inmates of Wöbbelin concentration camp May 28, 2008

Wöbbelin was a subcamp of the Neuengamme concentration camp near the city of Ludwigslust. The SS had established Wöbbelin to house concentration camp prisoners whom the SS had evacuated from other camps to prevent their liberation by the Allies. At its height, Wöbbelin held some 5,000 inmates, most of whom were suffering from starvation and disease. The camp was freed on May 2, 1945.

== History ==
In September 1944, a small camp called Reiherhorst ("egret’s nest") was built for American prisoners of war. On 12 February 1945, a group of inmates were transported to build a larger camp, by then known as KZ Wöbbelin. The SS-physician Alfred Trzebinski stated during his trial that 648 people were held at Wöbbelin camp until the end of March 1945. In mid-April, several transports from subcamps of Neuengamme and Ravensbrück concentration camp with more than 4,000 inmates arrived.

On May 2, 1945, the 8th Infantry Division and the 82nd Airborne Division encountered Wöbbelin, in which the living conditions were deplorable. There was little food or water and some prisoners had resorted to cannibalism. When the units arrived, they found about 1,000 inmates dead in the camp. In the aftermath, the U.S. Army ordered the townspeople in Ludwigslust to visit the camp and bury the dead.

On May 7, 1945, the 82nd Airborne Division conducted funeral services for 200 inmates in the town of Ludwigslust. Attending the ceremony were citizens of Ludwigslust, captured German officers, and several hundred members of the airborne division. The U.S. Army chaplain at the service delivered a eulogy stating that:

"The crimes here committed in the name of the German people and by their acquiescence were minor compared to those to be found in concentration camps elsewhere in Germany. Here there were no gas chambers, no crematoria; these men of Holland, Russia, Poland, Czechoslovakia, and France were simply allowed to starve to death. Within four miles of your comfortable homes 4,000 men were forced to live like animals, deprived even of the food you would give to your dogs. In three weeks 1,000 of these men were starved to death; 800 of them were buried in pits in the nearby woods. These 200 who lie before us in these graves were found piled four and five feet high in one building and lying with the sick and dying in other buildings."

In accordance with a policy mandated by General Dwight D. Eisenhower, the Supreme Commander of the Allied Forces, the U.S. Army in Ludwigslust ordered that "all atrocity victims to be buried in a public place", with crosses placed on the Christian graves and Stars of David placed on the Jewish graves, along with a stone monument to commemorate the dead.

== See also ==
- List of subcamps of Neuengamme

== Notes ==
This article incorporates text from the United States Holocaust Memorial Museum, and has been released under the GFDL.
