= Schwerin – Ludwigslust-Parchim I – Nordwestmecklenburg I =

Federal electoral district of Germany

12 Schwerin – Ludwigslust-Parchim I – Nordwestmecklenburg I
- Electoral district for the Bundestag
- Schwerin – Ludwigslust-Parchim I – Nordwestmecklenburg I in 2025
- State: Mecklenburg-Vorpommern
- Population: 269,200 (2019)
- Electorate: 214,853 (2021)
- Major settlements: Schwerin
- Area: 3,640.9 km^{2}

Current electoral district
- Created: 2002
- Party: AfD
- Member: Leif-Erik Holm
- Elected: 2025

Schwerin – Ludwigslust-Parchim I – Nordwestmecklenburg I (English: Schwerin – Ludwigslust-Parchim I – Northwestern Mecklenburg) is an electoral constituency (German: Wahlkreis) represented in the Bundestag. It elects one member via first-past-the-post voting. Under the current constituency numbering system, it is designated as constituency 12. It is located in western Mecklenburg-Vorpommern, comprising the city of Schwerin and western parts of the districts of Ludwigslust-Parchim and Nordwestmecklenburg.

Schwerin – Ludwigslust-Parchim I – Nordwestmecklenburg I was created for the 2002 federal election. From 2021 to 2025, it was represented by Reem Alabali-Radovan of the Social Democratic Party (SPD). Since 2025 it has been represented by Leif-Erik Holm of the AfD.

== Geography ==
Schwerin – Ludwigslust-Parchim I – Nordwestmecklenburg I is located in western Mecklenburg-Vorpommern. As of the 2021 federal election, it comprises the independent city of Schwerin, as well as western parts of Ludwigslust-Parchim district (specifically the municipalities of Boizenburg, Hagenow, Ludwigslust, and Lübtheen, and the Ämter of Boizenburg-Land, Dömitz-Malliß, Grabow, Hagenow-Land, Ludwigslust-Land, Neustadt-Glewe, Stralendorf, Wittenburg, and Zarrentin) and Nordwestmecklenburg (specifically the Ämter of Gadebusch, Lützow-Lübstorf, Rehna, and Schönberger Land).

== History ==
Schwerin – Ludwigslust-Parchim I – Nordwestmecklenburg I was created in 2002, then known as Schwerin – Ludwigslust. It contained parts of the abolished constituencies of Schwerin – Hagenow and Güstrow – Sternberg – Lübz – Parchim – Ludwigslust. Until 2013, it was constituency 13 in the numbering system. Originally, it comprised the independent city of Schwerin and the now-abolished district of Ludwigslust. In the 2013 election, it was expanded to include the Ämter of Gadebusch, Lützow-Lübstorf, Rehna, and Schönberger Land from the Nordwestmecklenburg district; it also acquired its current name and constituency number.

Election	No.	Name	Borders
2002	13	Schwerin – Ludwigslust	Schwerin city; Ludwigslust district
2005	13	Schwerin – Ludwigslust	Schwerin city; Ludwigslust district
2009	13	Schwerin – Ludwigslust	Schwerin city; Ludwigslust district
2013	12	Schwerin – Ludwigslust-Parchim I – Nordwestmecklenburg I	Schwerin city; Ludwigslust-Parchim district (only Boizenburg, Hagenow, Ludwigslust, and Lübtheen municipalities, and Boizenburg-Land Amt, Dömitz-Malliß Amt, Grabow Amt, Hagenow-Land Amt, Ludwigslust-Land Amt, Neustadt-Glewe Amt, Stralendorf Amt, Wittenburg Amt, and Zarrentin Amt); Nordwestmecklenburg district (only Gadebusch Amt, Lützow-Lübstorf Amt, Rehna Amt, and Schönberger Land Amt)
2017	12	Schwerin – Ludwigslust-Parchim I – Nordwestmecklenburg I	Schwerin city; Ludwigslust-Parchim district (only Boizenburg, Hagenow, Ludwigslust, and Lübtheen municipalities, and Boizenburg-Land Amt, Dömitz-Malliß Amt, Grabow Amt, Hagenow-Land Amt, Ludwigslust-Land Amt, Neustadt-Glewe Amt, Stralendorf Amt, Wittenburg Amt, and Zarrentin Amt); Nordwestmecklenburg district (only Gadebusch Amt, Lützow-Lübstorf Amt, Rehna Amt, and Schönberger Land Amt)
2021	12	Schwerin – Ludwigslust-Parchim I – Nordwestmecklenburg I	Schwerin city; Ludwigslust-Parchim district (only Boizenburg, Hagenow, Ludwigslust, and Lübtheen municipalities, and Boizenburg-Land Amt, Dömitz-Malliß Amt, Grabow Amt, Hagenow-Land Amt, Ludwigslust-Land Amt, Neustadt-Glewe Amt, Stralendorf Amt, Wittenburg Amt, and Zarrentin Amt); Nordwestmecklenburg district (only Gadebusch Amt, Lützow-Lübstorf Amt, Rehna Amt, and Schönberger Land Amt)
2025	12	Schwerin – Ludwigslust-Parchim I – Nordwestmecklenburg I	Schwerin city; Ludwigslust-Parchim district (only Boizenburg, Hagenow, Ludwigslust, and Lübtheen municipalities, and Boizenburg-Land Amt, Dömitz-Malliß Amt, Grabow Amt, Hagenow-Land Amt, Ludwigslust-Land Amt, Neustadt-Glewe Amt, Stralendorf Amt, Wittenburg Amt, and Zarrentin Amt); Nordwestmecklenburg district (only Gadebusch Amt, Lützow-Lübstorf Amt, Rehna Amt, and Schönberger Land Amt)

== Members ==
The constituency was held by the Social Democratic Party (SPD) from its creation in 2002 until 2009, during which time it was represented by Hans-Joachim Hacker. It was won by the Christian Democratic Union (CDU) in 2009, and represented by Dietrich Monstadt. He was re-elected in 2013 and 2017. Reem Alabali-Radovan won the constituency for the SPD in 2021 and Leif-Erik Holm won the constituency for the AfD in 2025.

Election	Member	Party	%
2002	Hans-Joachim Hacker	SPD	49.3
2005	Hans-Joachim Hacker	SPD	41.0
2009	Dietrich Monstadt	CDU	30.3
2013	Dietrich Monstadt	CDU	39.0
2017	Dietrich Monstadt	CDU	32.1
2021	Reem Alabali-Radovan	SPD	29.4
2025	Leif-Erik Holm	AfD	35.9

== Election results ==
=== 2025 election ===
Federal election (2025): Schwerin – Ludwigslust-Parchim I – Nordwestmecklenburg I
Notes:	Blue background denotes the winner of the electorate vote. Pink background denotes a candidate elected from their party list. Yellow background denotes an electorate win by a list member, or other incumbent. A ✓ or ✗ denotes status of any incumbent, win or lose respectively.						
Party	Candidate	Votes	%	±%	Party votes	%	±%
AfD	Leif-Erik Holm	60,863	35.9	▲19.3	54,975	32.3	▲16.6
CDU	Dietrich Monstadt	35,453	20.9	▲0.2	32,209	18.9	▲1.8
SPD	✗ Reem Alabali-Radovan	34,101	20.1	▼9.3	24,693	14.5	▼17.5
Left	Ina Latendorf	21,569	12.7	▲1.0	19,558	11.5	▲0.7
BSW					17,652	10.4	New
Greens	Miroslava Zahradníčková	5,531	3.3	▼4.8	9,494	5.6	▼2.5
FDP	Paul-Christian Schulz	4,870	2.9	▼4.8	5,613	3.3	▼5.3
Tierschutzpartei					2,310	1.4	▼0.4
FW	Alexander Dutz	4,753	2.8	▲0.5	1,977	1.2	▼0.4
Volt					1,050	0.6	▲0.4
BD	Berthold Riech	1,945	1.1	New	706	0.4	New
MLPD	Bert Beckmann	664	0.4	▲0.2	183	0.1	0.0
Informal votes		2,126			1,455		
Total valid votes		169,749			170,420		
Turnout		171,875	80.7	▲7.9			
AfD gain from SPD	Majority	25,410	15.0	N/A			

=== 2021 election ===
Federal election (2021): Schwerin – Ludwigslust-Parchim I – Nordwestmecklenburg I
Notes:	Blue background denotes the winner of the electorate vote. Pink background denotes a candidate elected from their party list. Yellow background denotes an electorate win by a list member, or other incumbent. A ✓ or ✗ denotes status of any incumbent, win or lose respectively.						
Party	Candidate	Votes	%	±%	Party votes	%	±%
SPD	Reem Alabali-Radovan	45,189	29.4	▲7.3	49,271	32.0	▲13.3
CDU	✗ Dietrich Monstadt	31,754	20.7	▼11.4	26,383	17.2	▼15.8
AfD	Steffen Beckmann	25,393	16.5	▲0.6	24,185	15.7	▼0.8
Left	Ina Latendorf	17,906	11.7	▼5.5	16,604	10.8	▼5.9
Greens	Claudia Tamm	12,061	7.9	▲4.1	12,419	8.1	▲3.8
FDP	Yannik Meffert	11,769	7.7	▲2.8	13,242	8.6	▲2.2
Tierschutzpartei					2,645	1.7	▲0.6
FW	Anja Klähn	3,552	2.3	▼0.2	2,476	1.6	▲0.6
dieBasis	Eberhard Gericke	2,417	1.6		2,207	1.4	
PARTEI	Alrik Stoffers	1,910	1.2		1,252	0.8	▼0.1
NPD					1,112	0.7	▼0.4
Pirates	Karsten Jagau	1,414	0.9		1,023	0.7	
Team Todenhöfer					399	0.3	
Volt					381	0.2	
Humanists					175	0.1	
ÖDP					151	0.1	0.0
DKP					121	0.1	
MLPD	Bert Beckmann	243	0.2	▼0.1	117	0.1	▼0.1
Informal votes		2,957			2,402		
Total valid votes		153,608			154,163		
Turnout		156,565	72.9	▲0.4			
SPD gain from CDU	Majority	13,435	8.7				

=== 2017 election ===
Federal election (2017): Schwerin – Ludwigslust-Parchim I – Nordwestmecklenburg I
Notes:	Blue background denotes the winner of the electorate vote. Pink background denotes a candidate elected from their party list. Yellow background denotes an electorate win by a list member, or other incumbent. A ✓ or ✗ denotes status of any incumbent, win or lose respectively.						
Party	Candidate	Votes	%	±%	Party votes	%	±%
CDU	✓ Dietrich Monstadt	49,733	32.1	▼6.9	51,083	32.9	▼7.5
SPD	Martina Tegtmeier	34,267	22.1	▼3.8	28,947	18.6	▼2.9
Left	André Walther	26,655	17.2	▼5.0	25,929	16.7	▼3.7
AfD	Dennis Augustin	24,764	16.0		25,692	16.5	▲11.3
FDP	Stev Ötinger	7,470	4.8	▲3.3	9,879	6.4	▲4.1
Greens	Mathias Engling	5,837	3.8	▲0.2	6,606	4.3	▼0.2
FW	Jana Wolff	3,874	2.5	▲0.5	1,625	1.0	▲0.1
Tierschutzpartei					1,793	1.2	
NPD	Stefan Köster	1,515	1.0	▲2.4	1,700	1.1	▼1.6
PARTEI					1,363	0.9	
Independent	Angelika Stoof	547	0.4				
MLPD	Bert Beckmann	440	0.3		231	0.1	0.0
BGE					416	0.3	
ÖDP					147	0.1	
Informal votes		1,969			1,660		
Total valid votes		155,102			155,411		
Turnout		157,071	72.4	▲4.9			
CDU hold	Majority	15,466	10.0	▼3.1			

=== 2013 election ===
Federal election (2013): Schwerin – Ludwigslust-Parchim I – Nordwestmecklenburg I
Notes:	Blue background denotes the winner of the electorate vote. Pink background denotes a candidate elected from their party list. Yellow background denotes an electorate win by a list member, or other incumbent. A ✓ or ✗ denotes status of any incumbent, win or lose respectively.						
Party	Candidate	Votes	%	±%	Party votes	%	±%
CDU	✓ Dietrich Monstadt	56,966	39.0	▲8.7	59,081	40.3	▲8.9
SPD	Hans-Joachim Hacker	37,864	25.9	▲1.2	31,566	21.5	▲1.3
Left	Dietmar Bartsch	32,404	22.2	▼6.2	29,869	20.4	▼7.0
AfD					7,736	5.3	
Greens	Frank Fiedler	5,205	3.6	▼1.8	6,538	4.5	▼1.4
NPD	Udo Pastörs	4,928	3.4	▲0.2	3,922	2.7	▼0.3
Pirates	Karsten Jagau	3,340	2.3		2,581	1.8	▼0.4
FW	Sabine Bank	2,920	2.0		1,398	1.0	
FDP	Thomas Heldberg	2,255	1.5	▼6.3	3,303	2.3	▼7.4
Tierschutzpartei					918	0.7	
PRO					251	0.2	
MLPD					164	0.1	▼0.1
Independent	Benno Falk	124	0.1				
Independent	Brigitte Ahlgrim	102	0.1				
REP					70	0.0	▼0.1
Informal votes		2,506			2,135		
Total valid votes		146,108			146,479		
Turnout		148,614	67.5	▲1.9			
CDU hold	Majority	19,102	13.1	▲12.3			

=== 2009 election ===
Federal election (2009): Schwerin – Ludwigslust
Notes:	Blue background denotes the winner of the electorate vote. Pink background denotes a candidate elected from their party list. Yellow background denotes an electorate win by a list member, or other incumbent. A ✓ or ✗ denotes status of any incumbent, win or lose respectively.						
Party	Candidate	Votes	%	±%	Party votes	%	±%
CDU	Dietrich Monstadt	34,633	29.3	▲2.5	36,653	30.9	▲5.2
Left	Dietmar Bartsch	33,681	28.5	▲7.2	32,623	27.5	▲5.6
SPD	✗ Hans-Joachim Hacker	30,247	25.6	▼15.4	24,464	20.6	▼16.6
FDP	Christian Ahrendt	9,401	7.9	▲4.0	11,405	9.6	▲3.7
Greens	Silke Gajek	6,353	5.4	▲2.7	6,833	5.8	▲1.2
NPD	Udo Pastörs	3,945	3.3	▼0.1	3,598	3.0	▼0.3
Pirates					2,579	2.2	
MLPD					211	0.2	▼0.1
REP					198	0.2	
Informal votes		2,032			1,728		
Total valid votes		118,260			118,564		
Turnout		120,292	65.7	▼7.1			
CDU gain from SPD	Majority	952	0.8				

=== 2005 election ===
Federal election (2005): Schwerin – Ludwigslust
Notes:	Blue background denotes the winner of the electorate vote. Pink background denotes a candidate elected from their party list. Yellow background denotes an electorate win by a list member, or other incumbent. A ✓ or ✗ denotes status of any incumbent, win or lose respectively.						
Party	Candidate	Votes	%	±%	Party votes	%	±%
SPD	✓ Hans-Joachim Hacker	54,180	41.0	▼8.3	49,324	37.3	▼9.6
CDU	Andreas Petters	35,360	26.8	▲1.8	34,064	25.7	▲0.3
Left	Dietmar Bartsch	28,167	21.3	▲5.8	28,978	21.9	▲6.4
FDP	Christian Ahrendt	5,158	3.9	▼0.5	7,781	5.9	▲0.7
NPD	Stefan Köster	4,509	3.4	▲2.5	4,431	3.3	▲2.4
Greens	Ulrich Teubler	3,466	2.6	▲0.1	6,102	4.6	▲0.4
Independent	Hartmut Linow	1,306	1.0				
GRAUEN					966	0.7	
PBC					406	0.3	
MLPD					358	0.3	
Informal votes		2,596			2,332		
Total valid votes		132,146			132,410		
Turnout		134,742	72.8	▲0.2			
SPD hold	Majority	18,820	14.2				
