= Wittenförden =

- Municipality
- Coat of arms

- Location of Wittenförden within Ludwigslust-Parchim district
- Interactive map of Wittenförden
- Location within Germany Location within Mecklenburg-Vorpommern
- Coordinates: 53°37′N 11°19′E
- Country: Germany
- State: Mecklenburg-Vorpommern
- District: Ludwigslust-Parchim
- Municipal assoc.: Stralendorf

Government
  - Mayor: Manfred Bosselmann

Area
  - Total: 12.23 km^{2} (4.72 sq mi)
- Elevation: 62 m (203 ft)

Population (2025-12-31)
  - Total: 2,395
  - Density: 195.8/km^{2} (507.2/sq mi)
- Time zone: UTC+01:00 (CET)
  - Summer (DST): UTC+02:00 (CEST)
- Postal codes: 19073
- Dialling codes: 0385
- Vehicle registration: LWL
- Website: www.wittenfoerden.de

Wittenförden is a municipality in the Ludwigslust-Parchim district, in Mecklenburg-Vorpommern, Germany. The municipality has a seat in the Office of Stralendorf from where it is administered. It lies on the western boundary of Schwerin by the Neumühler See, one of several lakes in the area.

== History ==
There is evidence that man has settled in the area since the Neolithic period although the exact date of the origin of the municipality is not known. The first mention of the area in writing was in 1217 about the building of a church and a cemetery. The German derivative of the local name is White Fjord, which suggests that it is taken from the Neumühler See and its sinuous form. The local industry was primarily agriculture and forestry, and after the Thirty-Year War, peat-extraction. A commercial district developed after 1990, which provides about 500 jobs. After the reunification of Germany, the population of Wittenförden has occasionally almost tripled due primarily to the migration of people from urban areas.

== Transport links ==
Wittenförden is situated two kilometres from the Schwerin bypass (B 106). The nearest railway station five kilometres away at Schwerin. Wittenförden has a bus service as part of the Schwerin transport network.

== Local sights ==
A Neo-Gothic village church dating from the 19th century.

== Heraldry ==
The design of the crest is a white willow tree with three branches on a red background and between the two longer outside branches, a golden bell.
