= WNG =

WNG or wng may refer to:

- WNG, the DS100 code for Neustadt-Glewe station, Mecklenburg-Vorpommern, Germany
- WNG, the National Rail station code for Waun-gron Park railway station, Cardiff, Wales
- wng, the ISO 639-3 language code for Wanggom language, South Papua, Indonesia
