= Brenz =

Brenz may refer to:

- Brenz (river), a river in southern Germany
- Brenz an der Brenz, a village in Baden-Württemberg, Germany
- Brenz, Mecklenburg-Vorpommern, a municipality in Mecklenburg-Vorpommern, Germany
- Johannes Brenz, a 16th-century German theologian
