= Death marches during the Holocaust =

Nazi forced transfers of prisoners

- Dachau concentration camp inmates on a death march, photographed on 28 April 1945 by Benno Gantner from his balcony in Percha. The prisoners were heading in the direction of Wolfratshausen.
- Location: Central and Eastern Europe
- Date: 1939–1945
- Incident type: Death march, population transfer, genocide
- Victims: Estimated hundreds of thousands
- Memorials: Various Holocaust memorials and museums

During the Holocaust, death marches (German: Todesmärsche) were massive forced transfers of prisoners from one Nazi camp to other locations, which involved walking long distances resulting in numerous deaths of weakened people. Most death marches took place toward the end of World War II, mostly after summer/autumn of 1944 and during throughout January-April 1945. Hundreds of thousands of prisoners, mostly Jews, from Nazi camps near the Eastern Front were moved to camps inside Germany away from the Allied forces. Their purpose was to continue the use of prisoners' slave labour, to remove evidence of crimes against humanity, and to keep the prisoners to bargain with the Allies.

Prisoners were marched to train stations, often a long way; transported for days at a time without food in freight trains; then forced to march again to a new camp. Those who lagged behind or fell were shot. The largest death march took place in January 1945. Nine days before the Soviet Red Army arrived at the Auschwitz concentration camp, the Germans marched 56,000 prisoners toward a train station at Wodzisław, 35 miles (56 km) away, to be transported to other camps. Around 15,000 died on the way.

Earlier marches of prisoners, also known as "death marches", include those in 1939 in the Lublin Reservation, Poland, and in 1942 in Reichskommissariat Ukraine.

== Overview ==
Towards the end of World War II in 1945, Nazi Germany had evacuated an estimated 10 to 15 million people, mostly from East Prussia and occupied Eastern and Central Europe. While the Allied forces advanced from the West, and the Red Army advanced from the East, trapped in the middle, the German SS divisions abandoned the concentration camps, moving or destroying evidence of the atrocities they had committed. Thousands of prisoners were killed in the camps before the marches commenced. These executions were deemed crimes against humanity during the Nuremberg trials.

Although most of the prisoners were already very weak or ill after enduring the routine violence, overwork, and starvation of concentration camp or prison camp life, they were marched for kilometres in the snow to railway stations, then transported for days without food, water, or shelter in freight carriages originally designed for cattle. On arrival at their destination, they were then forced to march again to new camps. Prisoners who were unable to keep up due to fatigue or illness were usually executed by gunshot. The evacuation of Majdanek inmates began in April 1944. The prisoners of Kaiserwald were transported to Stutthof or killed in August. Mittelbau-Dora was evacuated in April 1945.

The SS killed large numbers of prisoners by starvation before the marches and shot many more dead both during and after for not being able to keep pace. Seven hundred prisoners were killed during one ten-day march of 7,000 Jews, including 6,000 women, who were being moved from camps in the Danzig region. Those still alive when the marchers reached the coast were forced into the Baltic Sea and shot.

Elie Wiesel, Holocaust survivor and winner of the 1986 Nobel Peace Prize, describes in his book Night (1960) how he and his father, Shlomo, were forced on a death march from Buna (Auschwitz III) to Gleiwitz.

== Early marches ==
=== Chełm to Hrubieszów, Sokal and Belz ===
In December 1939, 2,000 male Jews from Chełm, Poland, were forced on a death march to the nearby town of Hrubieszów; 200–800 died during the march. At Hrubieszów, another 2,000 Jews were rounded up and forced to join the Chełm Jews.

=== Lublin to Biała Podlaska and Parczew ===
In January 1940, the Germans deported a group of prisoners from the Lipowa 7 prisoner of war camp to Biała Podlaska and then to Parczew. They rushed them on foot among snowstorms and temperatures below −20 °C (−4 °F). Those POWs who did not follow orders were killed by the German guards. The inhabitants of the nearby villages were forced to collect and bury the bodies in mass graves. Only a small group of prisoners survived this march of death. A few were able to escape into the woods and join the partisans.

=== Belz to Hrubieszow ===
In early June 1942, Jews concentrated in Belz were driven in a 60-kilometre (37 mi) death march to Hrubieszow. Those who could not continue on the way were shot by the SS guards. All death march survivors were deported along with about 3,000 Jews from Hrubieszow to Sobibor.

== End of the war ==
=== Auschwitz to Loslau ===
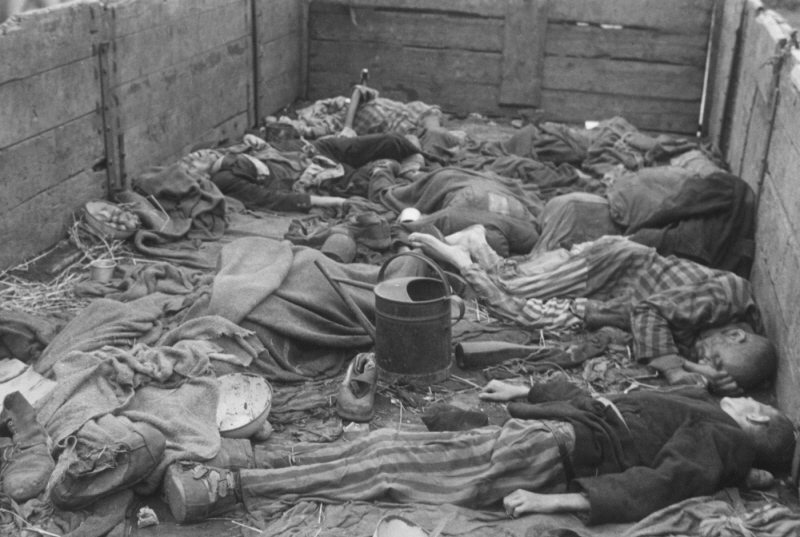
Victims of a death march (via train) from Buchenwald to Dachau, 29 April 1945

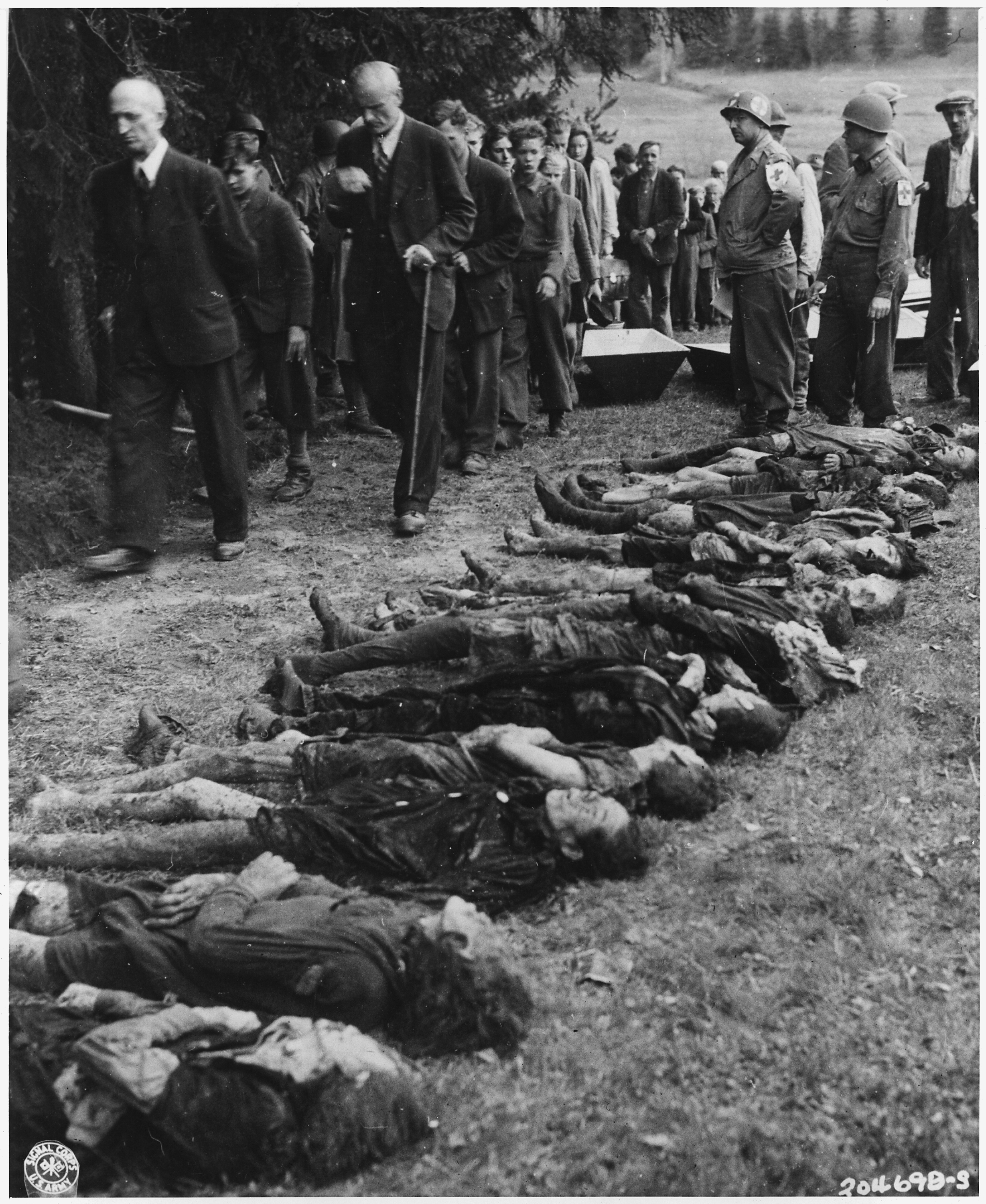
German civilians, under direction of U.S. medical officers, walk past a group of 30 Jewish women starved to death (Volary, Czechoslovakia) 1945

The largest and the most notorious of the death marches took place in mid-January 1945. On January 12, the Soviet army began its Vistula-Oder Offensive, advancing on occupied Poland and reaching near enough such that artillery fire could be heard from the camps. By January 17, orders were given to vacate the Auschwitz concentration camp and its subcamps. Between the 17th and 21st, the SS began marching approximately 56,000 prisoners out of the Auschwitz camps, most of them 63 km (39 mi) west to the train depot at Wodzisław Śląski (Loslau), while others marched 55 km (34 mi) northwest to Gliwice (Gleiwitz), with some being marched to other locations, through Racibórz (Ratibor), Prudnik (Neustadt), Nysa (Neisse), Kłodzko (Glatz), Bielawa (Langenbielau), Wałbrzych (Waldenburg) and Jelenia Góra (Hirschberg). Temperatures of −20 °C (−4 °F) and lower were recorded at the time of these marches. Some residents of Upper Silesia tried to help the marching prisoners. Some of the prisoners themselves managed to escape the death marches to freedom. At least 3,000 prisoners died on the Gleiwitz route alone. Approximately 9,000-15,000 prisoners in total died on death marches out of Auschwitz's camps, and those who did survive were then put on freight trains and shipped to other camps deeper in German held territory.

=== Auschwitz to Dachau ===
On 17 January 1945, when Russian troops were approaching the Auschwitz concentration camp, prisoners were sent on a march to Dachau concentration camp. The ten day journey was on foot and by cattle car: many prisoners were killed along the way.

=== Stutthof to Lauenburg ===
The evacuation of about 50,000 prisoners from the Stutthof camp system in northern Poland began in January 1945. About 5,000 prisoners from Stutthof subcamps were marched to the Baltic Sea coast, forced into the water, and machine gunned. The rest of the prisoners were marched in the direction of Lauenburg in eastern Germany. They were cut off by the advancing Soviet forces. The Germans forced the surviving prisoners back to Stutthof. Marching in severe winter conditions and treated brutally by SS guards, thousands died during the march.

In late April 1945, the remaining prisoners were removed from Stutthof by sea, since it was completely encircled by Soviet forces. Again, hundreds of prisoners were forced into the sea and shot. Over 4,000 were sent by small boat to Germany, some to the Neuengamme concentration camp near Hamburg, and some to camps along the Baltic coast. Many drowned along the way. Shortly before the German surrender, some prisoners were transferred to Malmö, Sweden, and released into the care of that neutral country. It has been estimated that over 25,000 prisoners, around half, died during the evacuation from Stutthof and its subcamps. One hundred prisoners were liberated from Stutthof on 9 May 1945.

=== Ravensbrück towards northern Mecklenburg ===
In late March 1945, the SS sent 24,500 women prisoners from Ravensbrück concentration camp on death march to the north, to prevent leaving live witnesses in the camp when the Soviet Red Army would arrive, as was likely to happen soon. The survivors of this march were liberated on 30 April 1945, by a Soviet scout unit.

=== Buchenwald to Dachau, Flossenbürg and Theresienstadt ===
In early 1945, Buchenwald had received numerous prisoners moved from camps further east in territory lost to the Soviets, and camp authorities began to close the outlying camps of Buchenwald (such as those in Apolda and Altenburg) to concentrate prisoners in the main camp. In April 1945, about 28,000 prisoners were marched from Buchenwald on a journey of over 300 kilometers through Jena, Eisenberg, Bad Köstritz, and Gera with the intended destination of Dachau, Flossenbürg, and Theresienstadt. The remaining 21,000 prisoners in Buchenwald were liberated by the U.S. Third Army on 11 April 1945.

=== Dachau to the Austrian border ===
On 24 April 1945, the satellite labor camps around Dachau were being cleared out by the Nazis ahead of the advancing Allied troops, and some 15,000 prisoners were first marched to the Dachau camp, only to be sent southwards on a death march towards the Austrian border, the path for which generally headed southwards, partly along the eastern shore of the Starnberger See, taking a left turn to the east in the town of Eurasburg and heading towards the Tegernsee.

By 2 May 1945, only some of the 6,000 prisoners sent on the death march were still alive; those in failing health had been shot as they fell. On that day, as the eastwards-marching prisoners had passed through Bad Tölz and were nearing Waakirchen, nearly sixty kilometers (37 miles) south of Dachau, several hundred of the dead and dying were lying on open ground, nearly all covered in freshly fallen snow. They were spotted by advance scouts of the U.S. Army's 522nd Field Artillery Battalion of the 442nd Regimental Combat Team, the only segregated Japanese American military unit in Germany at the time. In the days prior, the same unit had liberated the Kaufering IV Hurlach satellite slave labor camp of the Dachau main camp's "system". The scouts and other American troops did what they could to save the survivors for at least two days before dedicated medical personnel could take over. A memorial to the rescue by the 522nd exists at 47°46′6.15″N 11°38′55.30″E, just under two kilometers west of the Waakirchen town centre.

Death march memorials

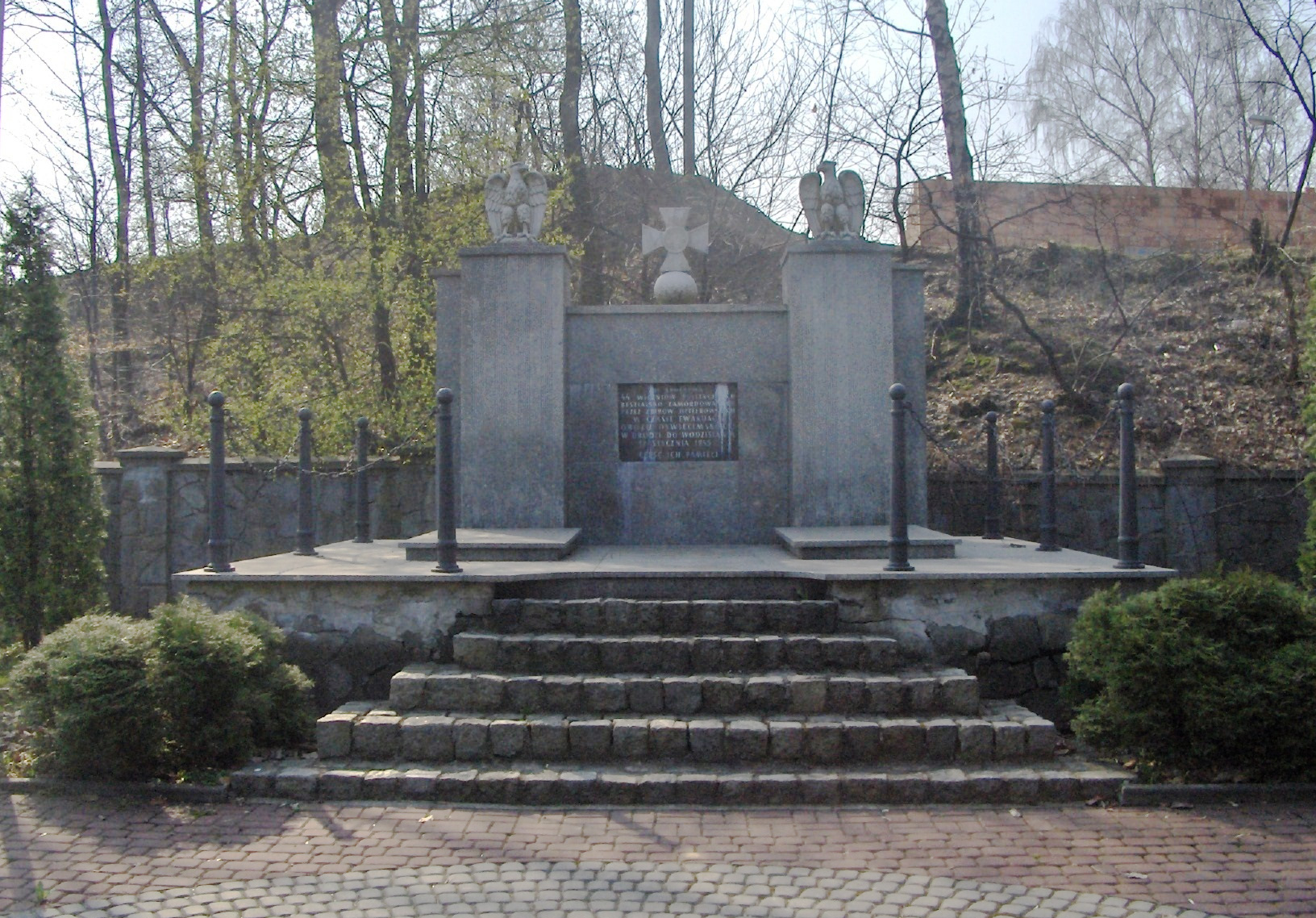
Memorial in Wodzisław Śląski of the death march from Auschwitz Birkenau

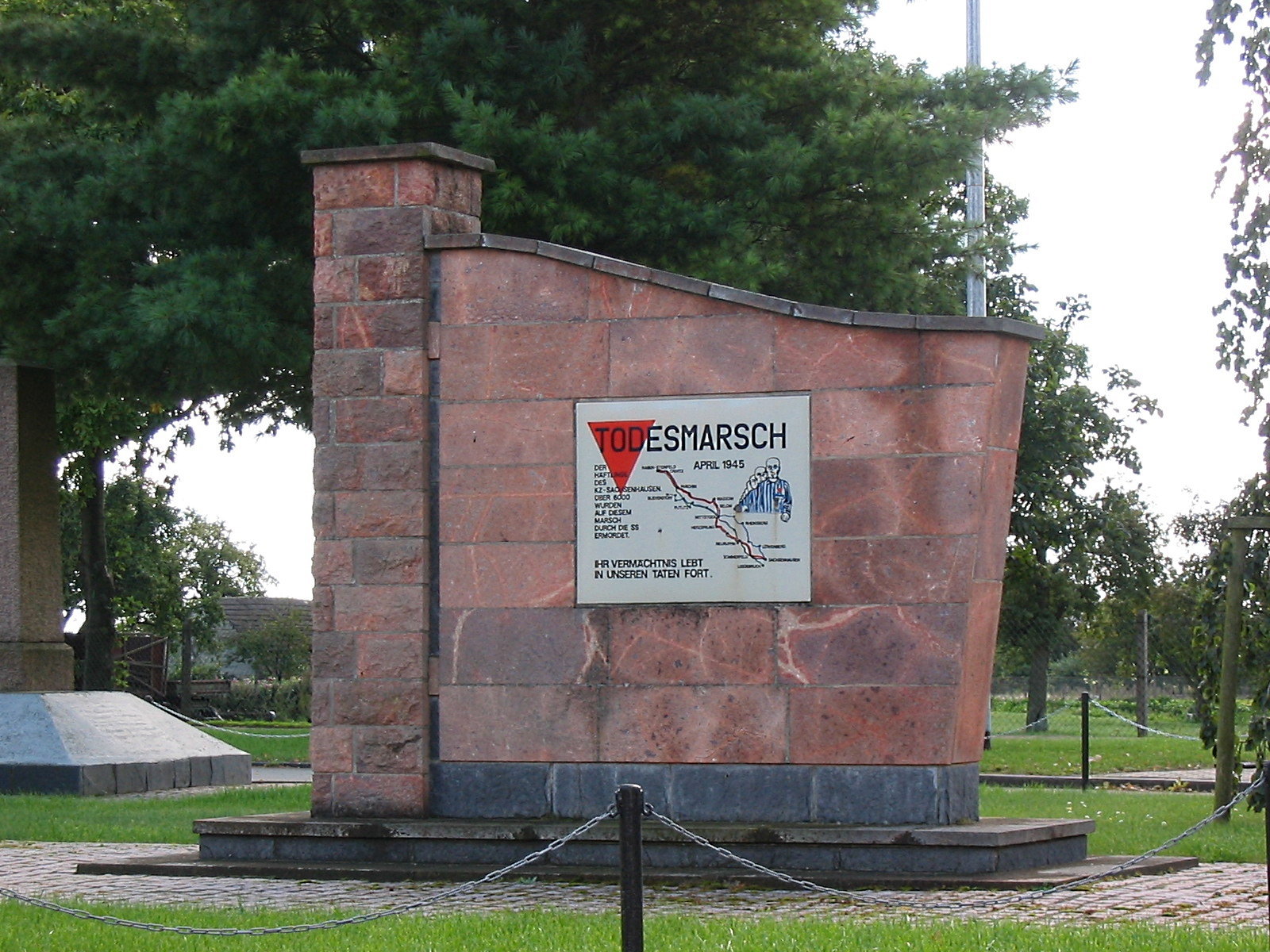
This memorial in Blievenstorf of the death march from Sachsenhausen concentration camp includes a red triangle emblem

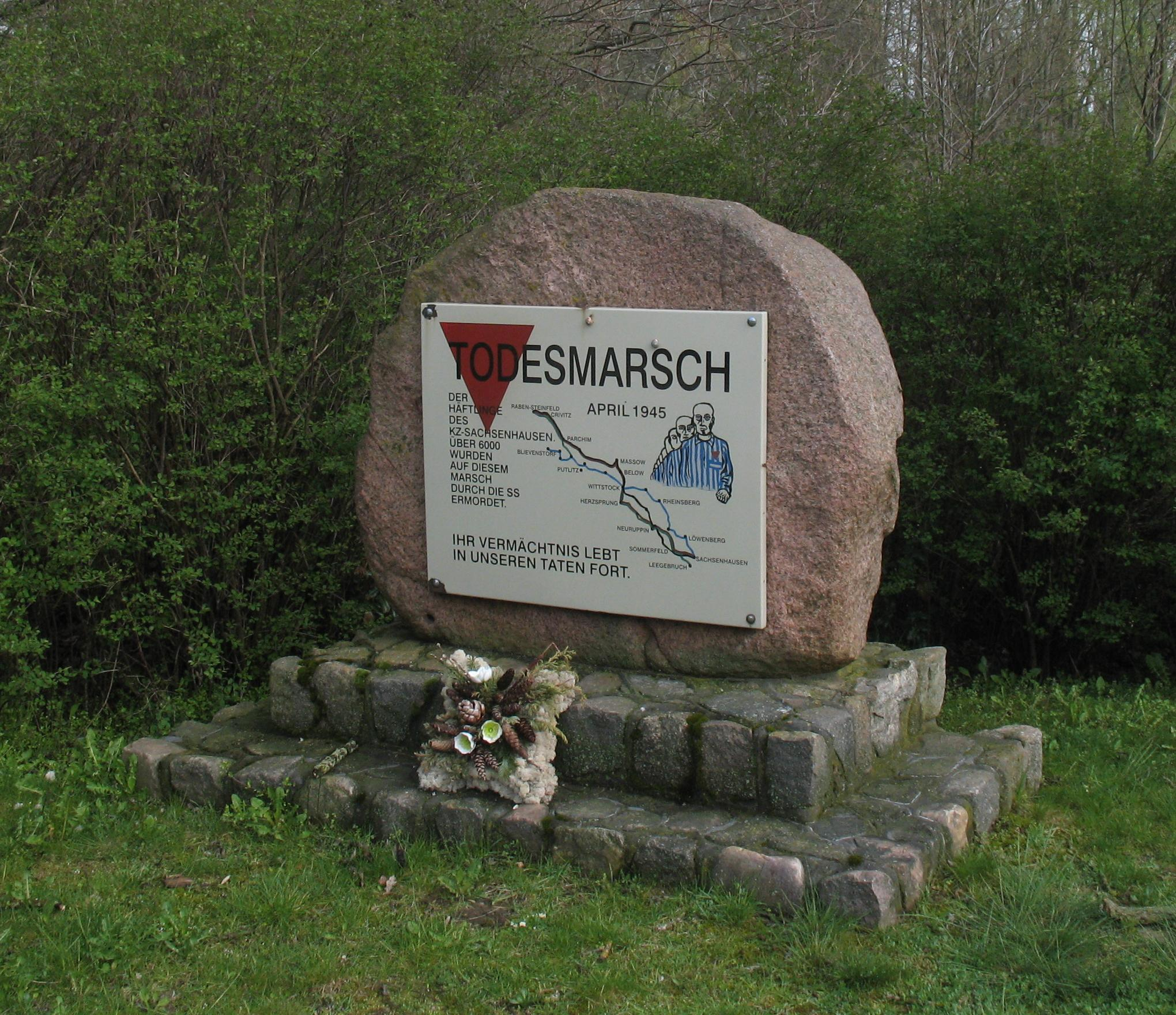
Memorial in Putlitz of the death march from Sachsenhausen concentration camp also includes a red triangle emblem (such triangles are known in Germany as references to the WW2-era concentration camps)

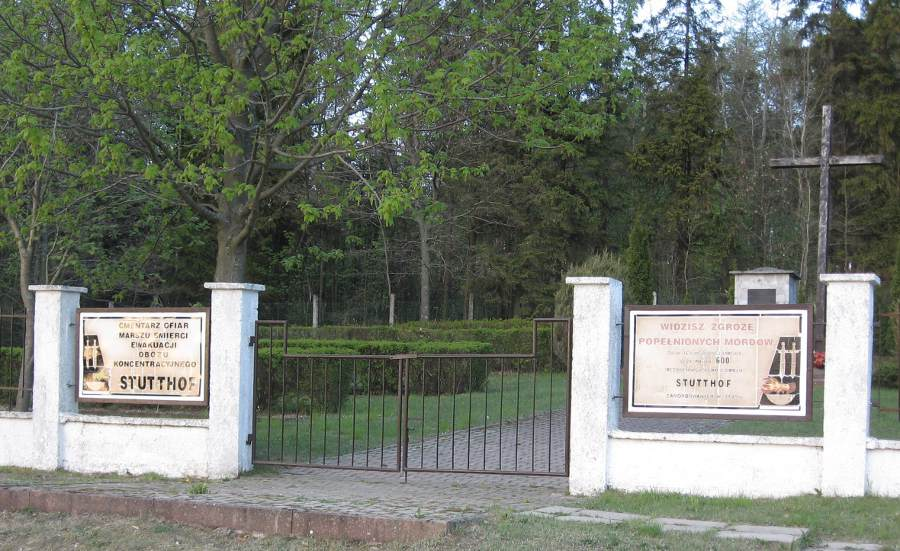
Holocaust cemetery in Nawcz for victims of the death march from Stutthof concentration camp

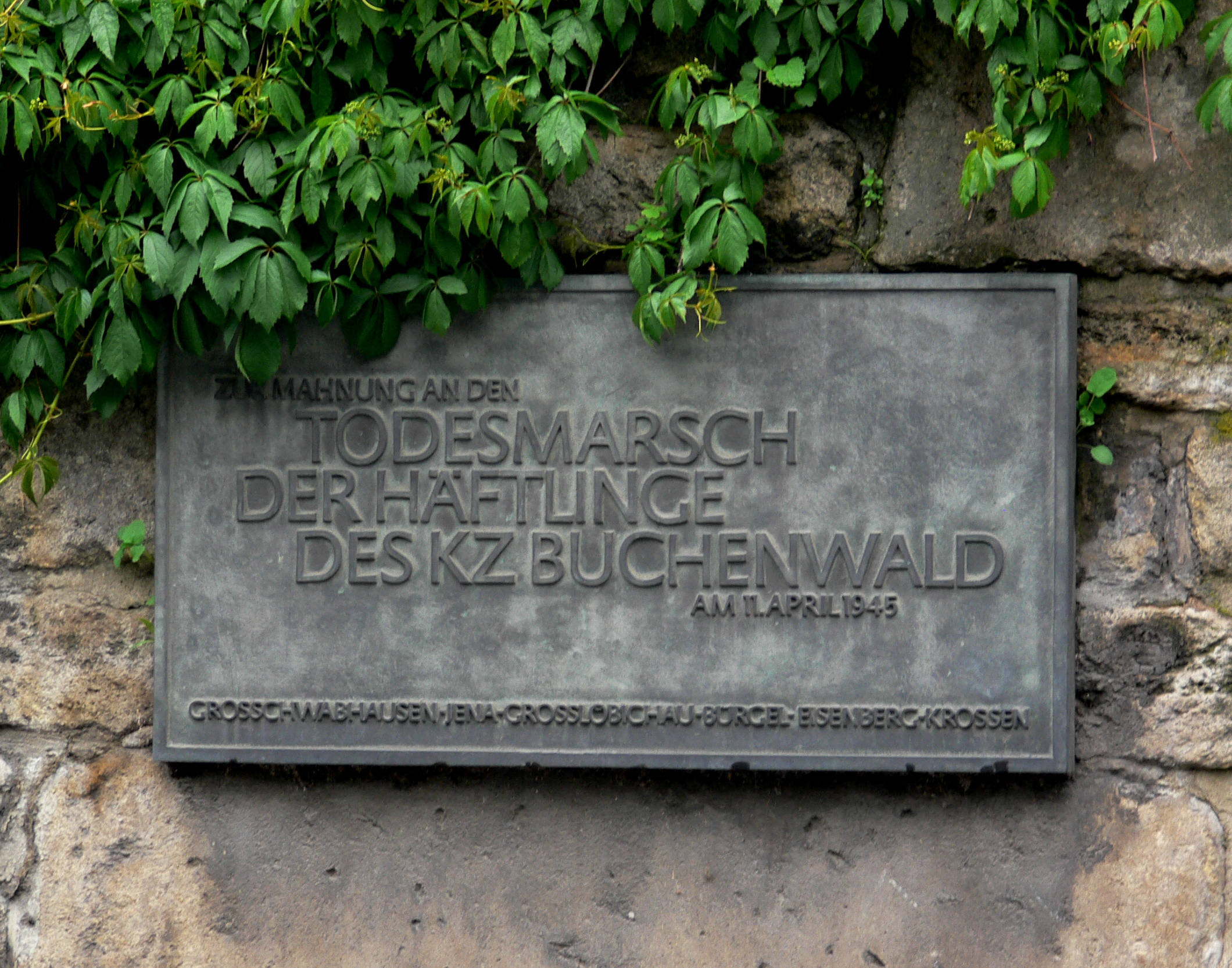
Memorial plaque to the victims of the death march in Jena

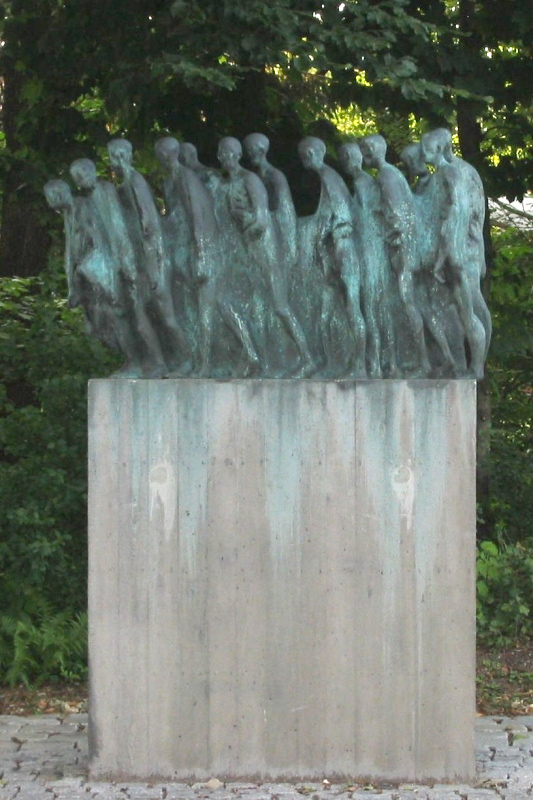
Memorial in Krailling for the death march from Dachau

== See also ==
- Death march
- The March (1945)
- March of the Living
