= Reem Alabali Radovan =

German politician (born 1990)

Reem Alabali Radovan MdB
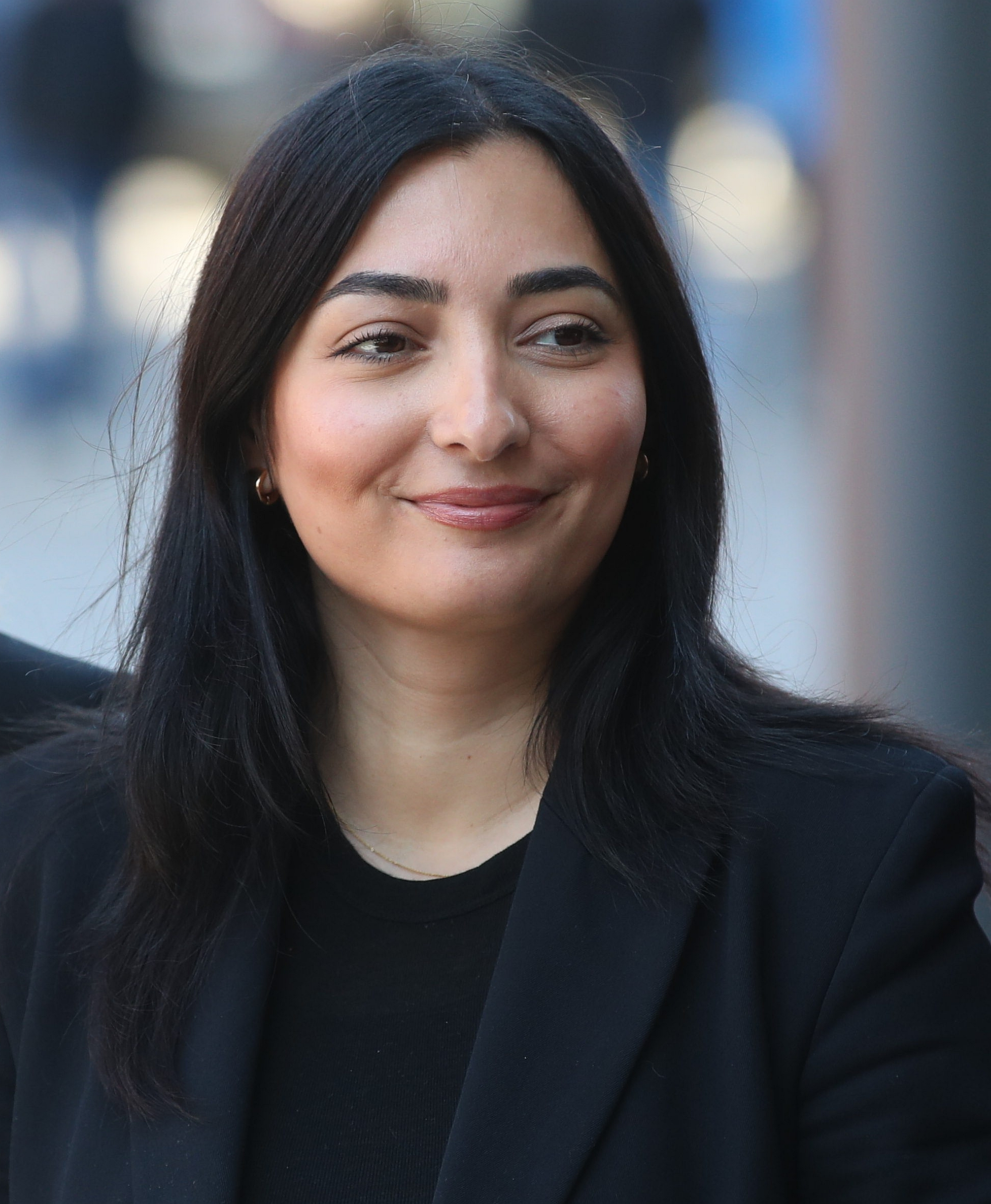
- Radovan in 2025

Minister for Economic Cooperation and Development
- Incumbent
- Assumed office 6 May 2025
- Chancellor: Friedrich Merz
- Preceded by: Svenja Schulze

Minister of State for Migration, Refugees and Integration
- In office 8 December 2021 – 6 May 2025
- Chancellor: Olaf Scholz
- Preceded by: Annette Widmann-Mauz
- Succeeded by: Natalie Pawlik

Member of the Bundestag; from Mecklenburg-Vorpommern
- Incumbent
- Assumed office 26 October 2021
- Preceded by: Dietrich Monstadt
- Constituency: Schwerin – Ludwigslust-Parchim I – Nordwestmecklenburg I (2021–2025); State list (2025–present)

Personal details
- Born: Reem Al-Abali; 1 May 1990 (age 36) Moscow, Soviet Union (now Russia)
- Citizenship: Germany
- Party: Social Democratic (since 2021)
- Spouse: Denis Radovan
- Children: 1
- Education: Free University of Berlin

Reem Alabali Radovan (Arabic: ريم العبلي, German: [ˈʁiːm alaˈbaːli ˈʁaːdovaːn]; born 1 May 1990) is a German politician of the Social Democratic Party (SPD) who has been serving as the Minister for Economic Cooperation and Development in the government of Chancellor Friedrich Merz since May 2025.

Alabali Radovan has been a Member of the Bundestag since 2021. In addition to her parliamentary work, she served as Minister of State at the Chancellery and Federal Commissioner for Migration, Refugees, and Integration in Chancellor Olaf Scholz's cabinet from 2021 to 2025. Together with Muhanad Al-Halak, she was the first person of Iraqi descent in the Bundestag, and individually, she is both the first person of Assyrian descent in the parliament and the youngest member of the Merz cabinet.

== Early life ==
Alabali Radovan was born in Moscow in 1990 to Iraqi Assyrian parents of Chaldean Catholic religious background. Her parents opposed the government of Saddam Hussein, and had moved to the Soviet Union in the 1980s to study engineering. Her father was a fighter of the Peshmerga, and her paternal grandfather, Muhammad Salih Alabali, was an Iraqi resistance leader who had been executed by the Ba'athist government. In 1996, after a brief stop in the Kurdistan Region of Iraq, the family sought, and received asylum in Germany, settling in Mecklenburg-Vorpommern.

Alabali Radovan completed her school education at the Gymnasium Fridericianum Schwerin. From her parents' involvement with Iraqi politics, Alabali Radovan was inspired to pursue political science and graduated with a bachelor's degree from the Free University of Berlin and obtained a master's degree program (distance learning) in Sustainable Development Cooperation at the Technical University of Kaiserslautern.

From June 2012 to July 2014, she worked as a technical staff member at the German Orient Institute and was employed in the field of economic development at the Near and Middle East Association in Berlin — initially as an assistant, later as a country officer.

In May 2015, she returned to Mecklenburg-Western Pomerania and worked at the Office for Migration and Refugee Affairs of the State Office for Internal Administration of Mecklenburg-Western Pomerania, specifically at the initial reception center for refugees in Nostorf — where she herself had been received with her parents in 1996. It was during her time there that she became an active member of the Social Democratic Party of Germany in the Schwerin – Ludwigslust-Parchim I – Nordwestmecklenburg I district.

== Political career ==
=== Career in state politics ===
In 2020, Alabali Radovan was appointed Commissioner for integration of the Mecklenburg-Vorpommern state government, succeeding Dagmar Kaselitz who resigned the previous year. She became an official member of the SPD in 2021.

=== Member of the German Parliament (2021–present) ===
For the 2021 German federal election, Alabali Radovan was elected in the constituency of Schwerin – Ludwigslust-Parchim I – Nordwestmecklenburg I, defeating incumbent Dietrich Monstadt of the CDU. She won with the most first-past-the post votes in the election.

Within her parliamentary group, Alabali Radovan belongs to the Parliamentary Left, a left-wing movement.

On 8 December 2021, the Scholz cabinet appointed Alabali Radovan as Federal Commissioner for Migration, Refugees and Integration with the rank of a Minister of State in the Federal Chancellery. From 23 February 2022, she additionally served as the Federal Government Commissioner for Anti-Racism, being the first commissioner to hold the post. In 2024, Radovan supported a bill ending a ban on dual-nationality to ease migration and naturalization efforts in Germany proposed by Scholz.

Between 13 and 14 April 2024, Alabali Radovan was elected to the position of Deputy State Chairwoman of the SPD in Mecklenburg-Vorpommern. Ahead of the 2025 German federal election, Alabali Radovan was unanimously nominated by the SPD for the candidacy. She was the top candidate for the SPD on the party's state list in Mecklenburg-Vorpommern, narrowly being chosen over Frank Junge.

In the negotiations to form a Grand Coalition between the Christian Democrats (CDU together with the Bavarian CSU) under the leadership of Friedrich Merz and the Social Democratic Party (SPD) following the 2025 German elections, Alabali Radovan was part of the SPD delegation in the working group on domestic policy, legal affairs, migration and integration, led by Günter Krings, Andrea Lindholz and Dirk Wiese.

In May 2025, Alabali Radovan was elected to the position of Federal Minister for Economic Cooperation and Development. She replaced SPD member Svenja Schulze when taking over the position.

In July, she visited South Africa to discuss economic relations between them and Germany, as well as to attend the 2025 G20 Johannesburg summit. She has used her position to prioritize building alliances with the Global South to combat crises.

== Other activities ==
=== International organizations ===
- Multilateral Investment Guarantee Agency (MIGA), World Bank Group, Ex-Officio Member of the Board of Governors (since 2025)
- World Bank, Ex-Officio Member of the Board of Governors (since 2025)

=== Corporate boards ===
- KfW, Ex-Officio Member of the Board of Supervisory Directors (since 2025)

=== Non-profit organizations ===
- Egidius Braun Foundation of the German Football Association, Member of the Board of Trustees
- Alliance for Democracy and Tolerance, Member of the Advisory Board

== Personal life ==
Alabali Radovan speaks fluent German, Arabic, Assyrian Neo-Aramaic, and English; from her years in Russia, her native language is Russian (though she has since forgotten it), and she studied classical languages while in grade school. Alabali Radovan recognizes her ancestry from Iraq, and after her electoral victory, many Iraqis celebrated on social media.

Alabali Radovan is married to professional boxer Denis Radovan, whose family also fled to Germany, and she likes to box in her spare time. In 2023, she gave birth to her first child. In June 2025, Alabali Radovan decided to drop the hyphen in her last name after a law for double names passed earlier that year. She currently resides in Schwerin and has two younger siblings.
