= Dümmer, Mecklenburg-Vorpommern =

Dümmer
- Municipality
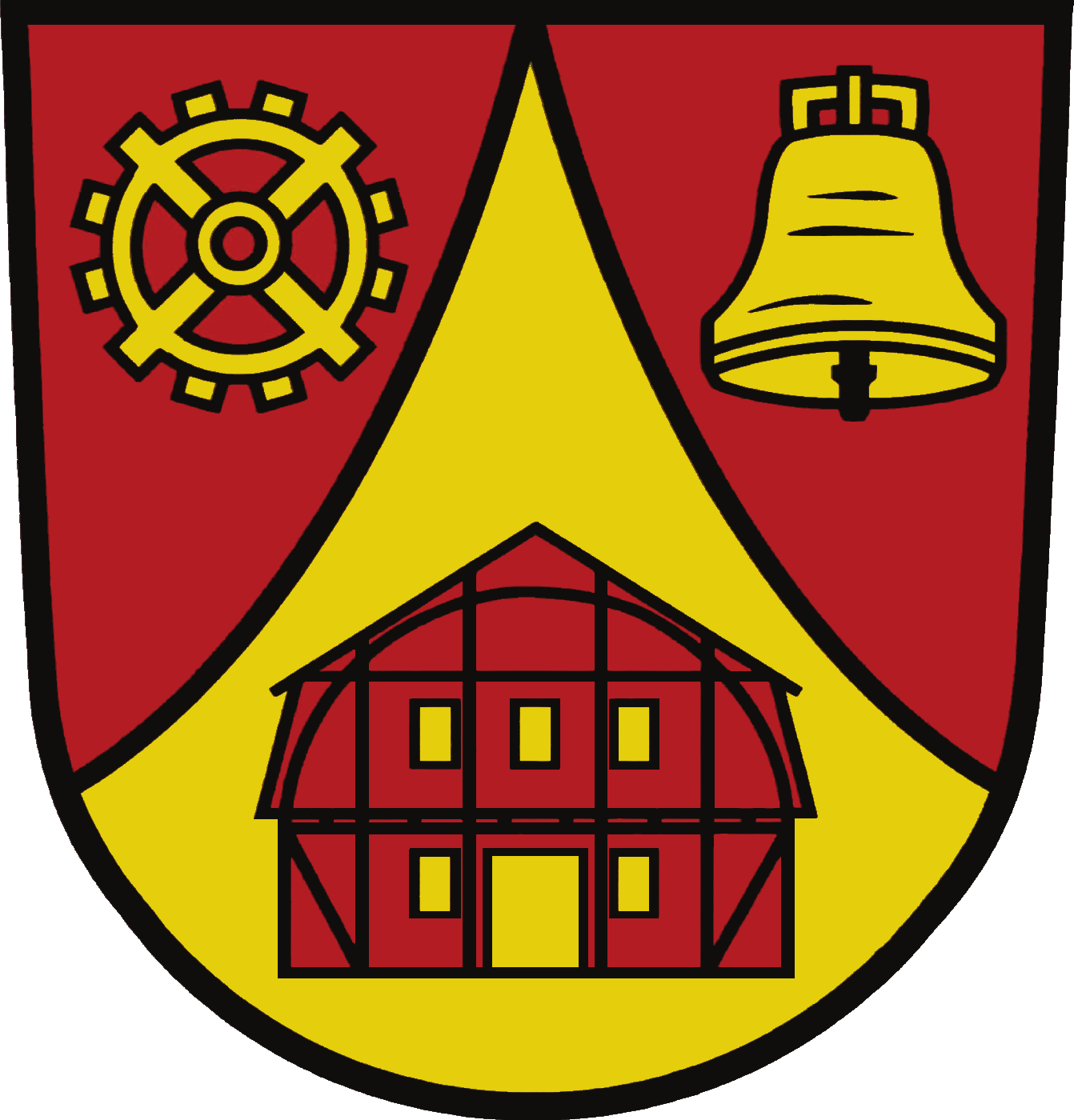
- Coat of arms

- Location of Dümmer within Ludwigslust-Parchim district
- Interactive map of Dümmer
- Location within Germany Location within Mecklenburg-Vorpommern
- Coordinates: 53°34′N 11°11′E
- Country: Germany
- State: Mecklenburg-Vorpommern
- District: Ludwigslust-Parchim
- Municipal assoc.: Stralendorf
- Subdivisions: 7

Government
  - Mayor: Janett Rieß

Area
  - Total: 31.52 km^{2} (12.17 sq mi)
- Elevation: 51 m (167 ft)

Population (2025-12-31)
  - Total: 1,583
  - Density: 50.22/km^{2} (130.1/sq mi)
- Time zone: UTC+01:00 (CET)
  - Summer (DST): UTC+02:00 (CEST)
- Postal codes: 19073
- Dialling codes: 03869
- Vehicle registration: LWL
- Website: www.amt-stralendorf.de

Dümmer (German pronunciation: [ˈdʏmɐ]) is a municipality in the Ludwigslust-Parchim district, in Mecklenburg-Vorpommern, Germany.

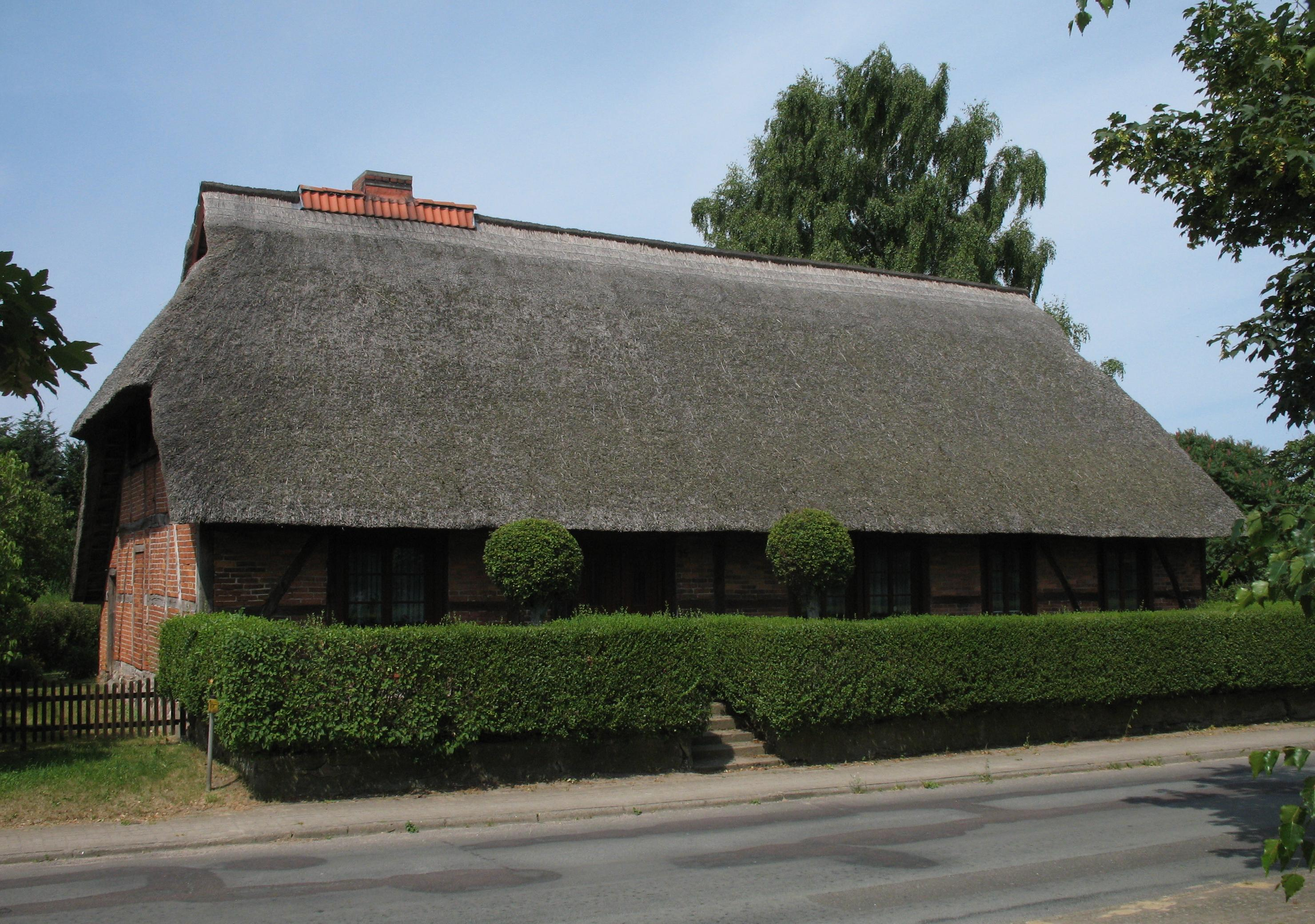

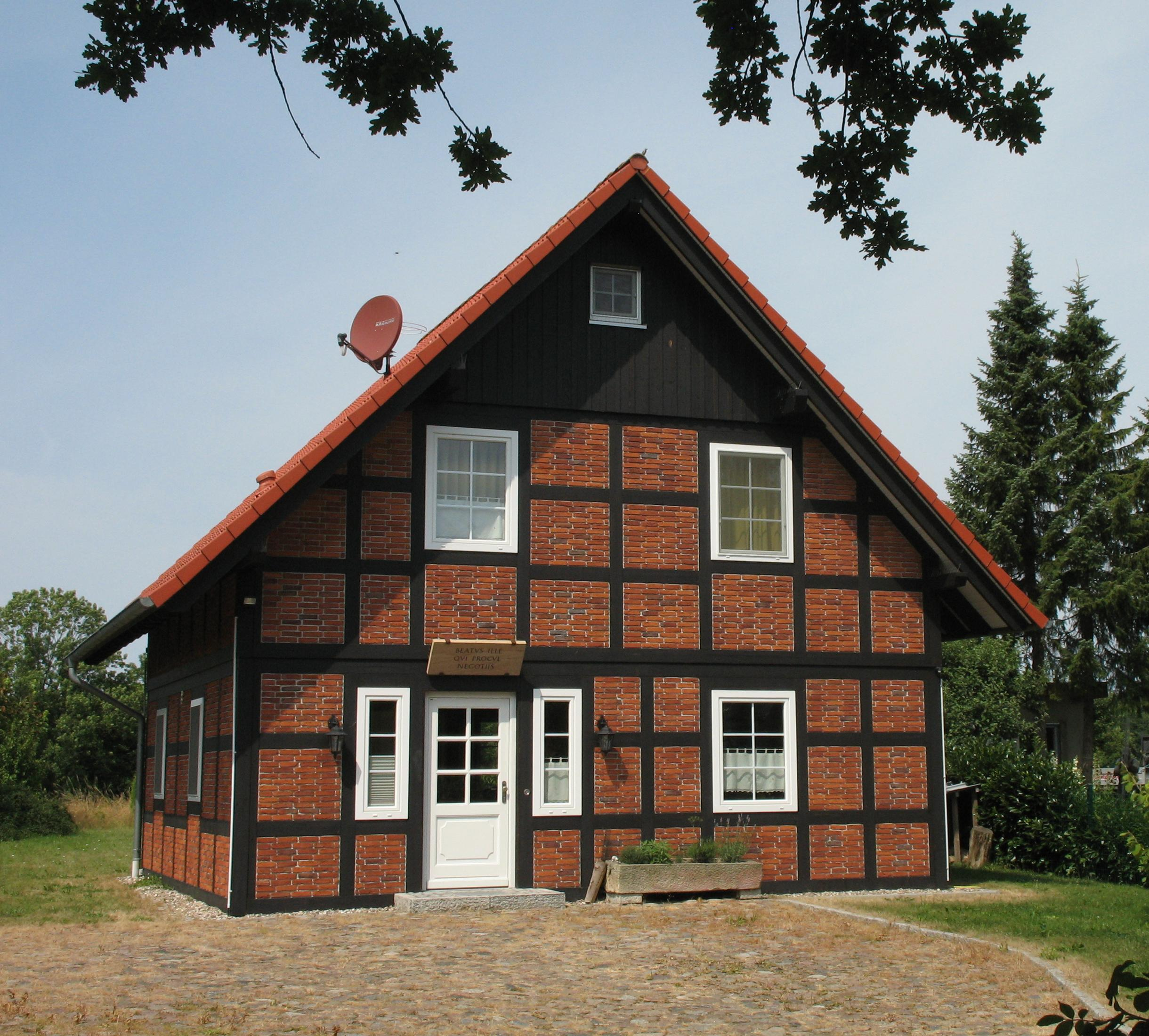

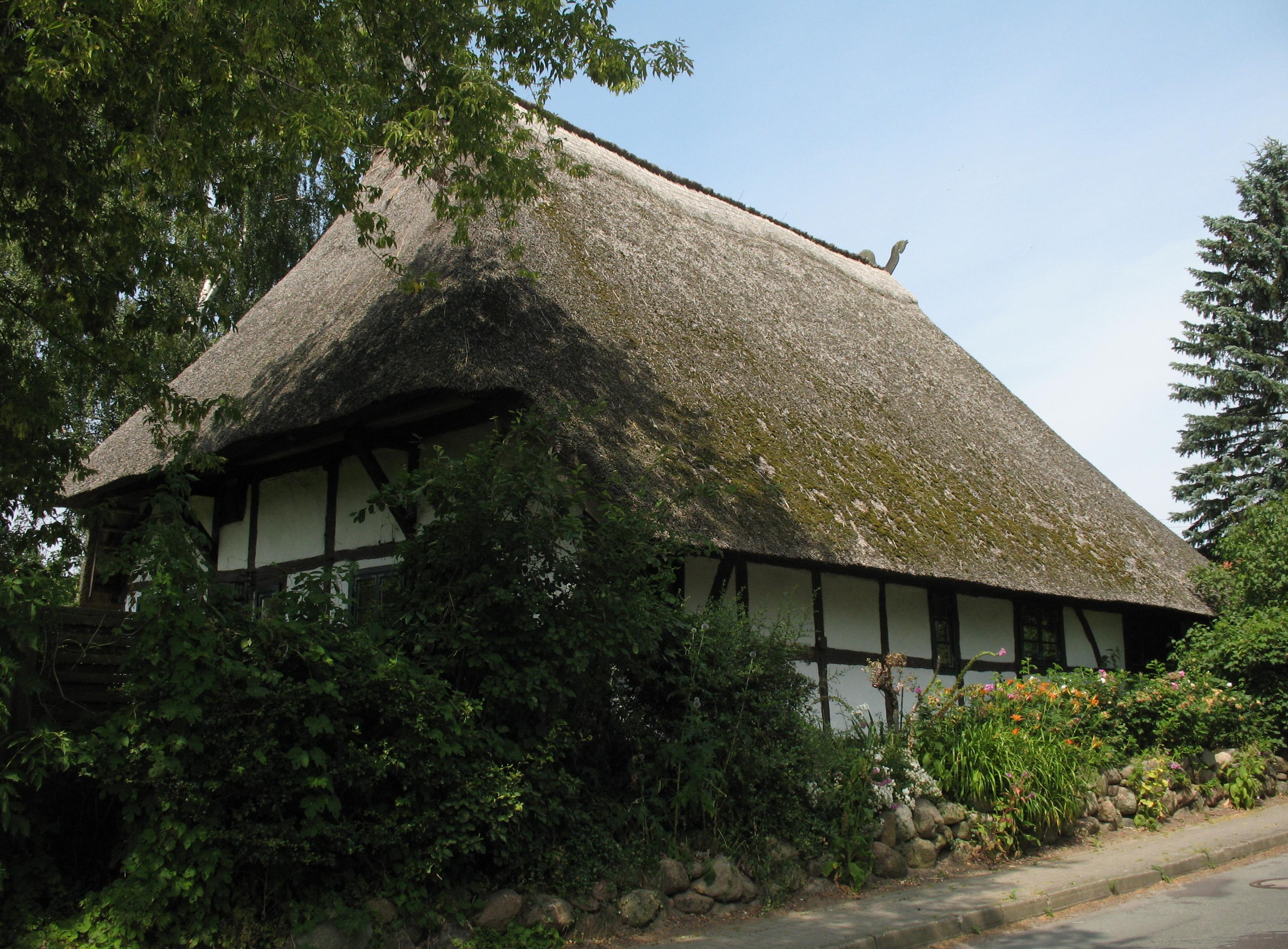

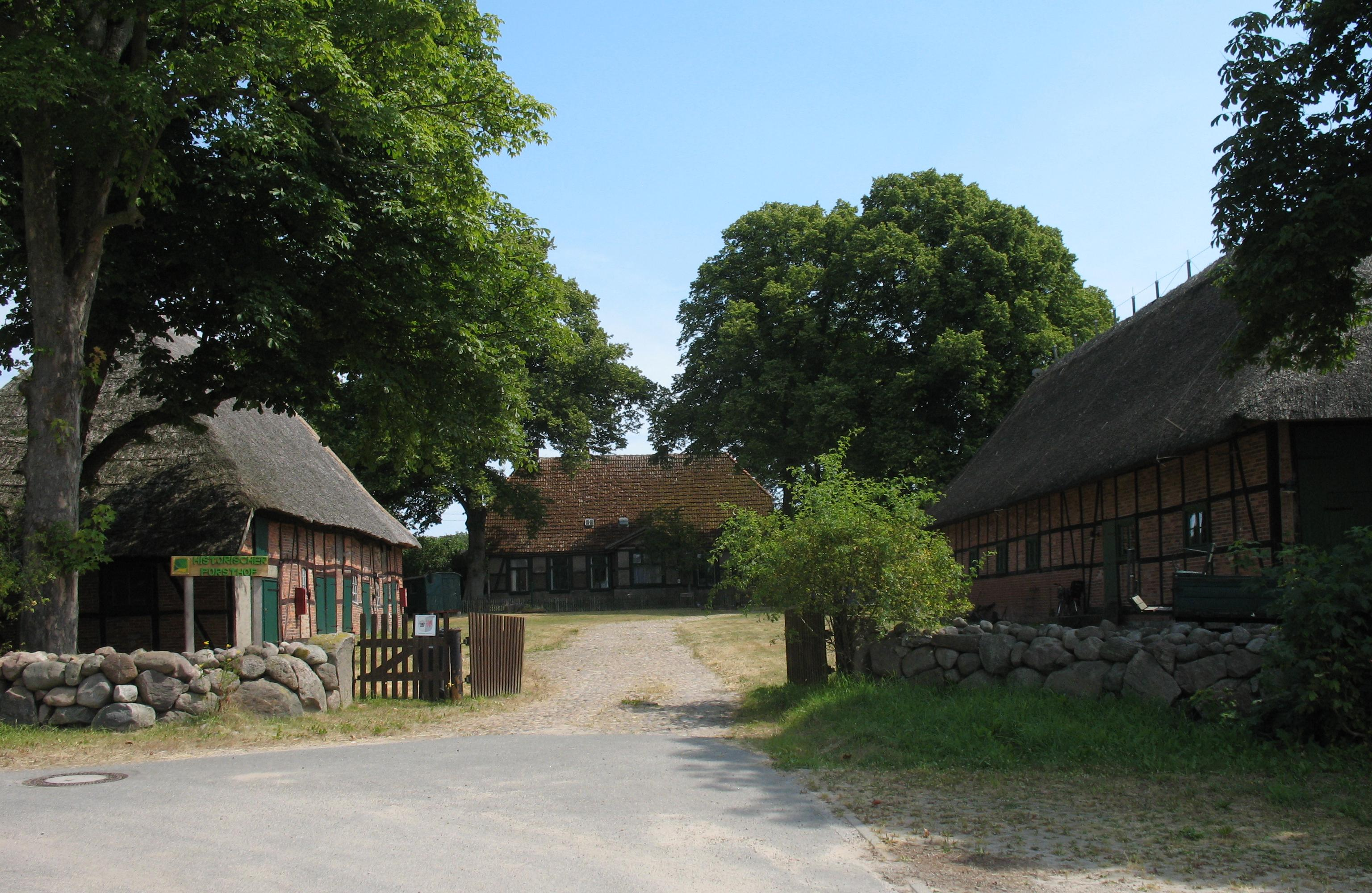

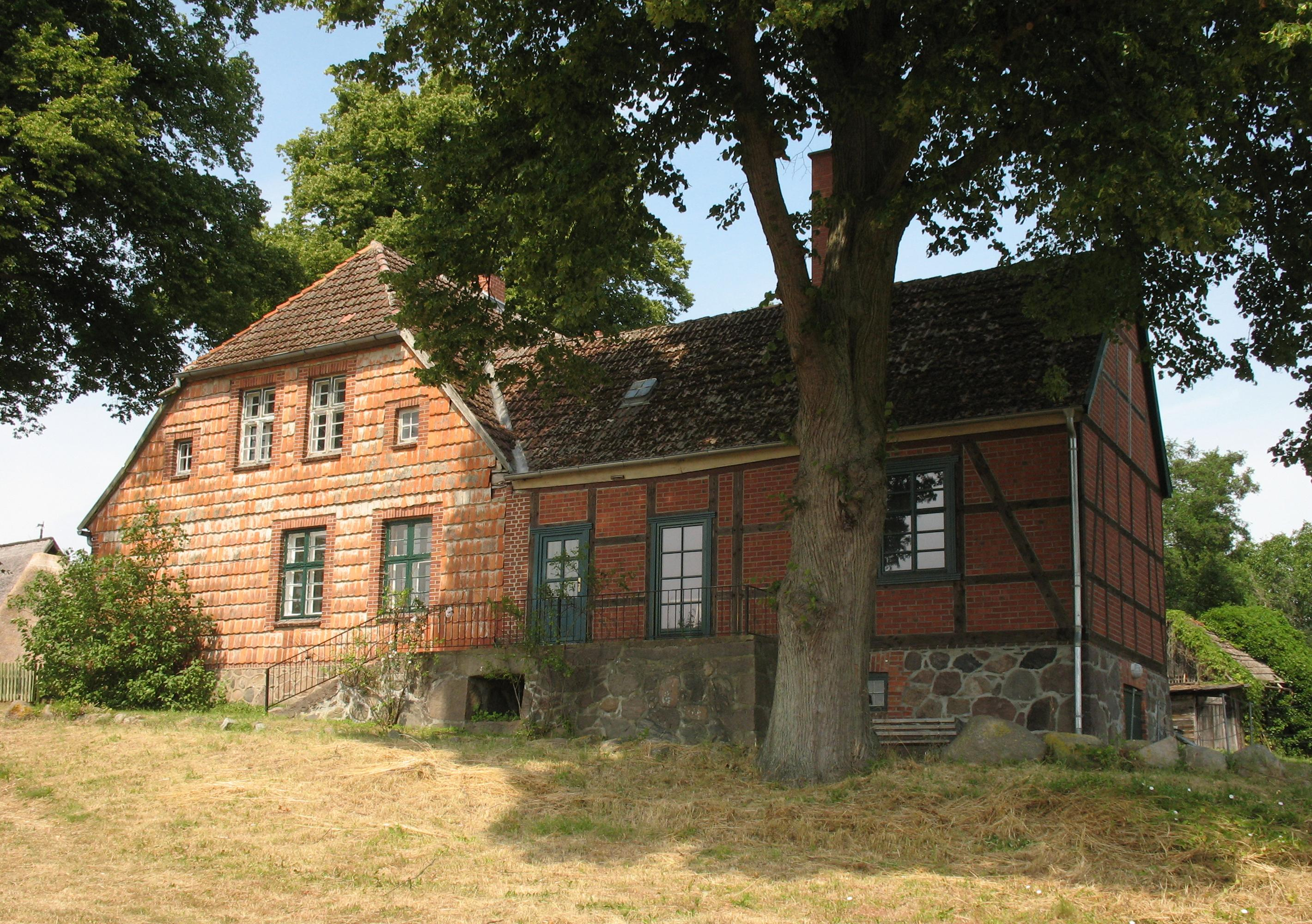
