= Neustadt-Glewe =

Town in Mecklenburg-Vorpommern, Germany

- Town
- Coat of arms

- Location of Neustadt-Glewe within Ludwigslust-Parchim district
- Interactive map of Neustadt-Glewe
- Location within Germany Location within Mecklenburg-Vorpommern
- Coordinates: 53°22′N 11°35′E
- Country: Germany
- State: Mecklenburg-Vorpommern
- District: Ludwigslust-Parchim
- Municipal assoc.: Neustadt-Glewe
- Subdivisions: 8

Government
  - Mayor: Arne Kröger (Ind.)

Area
  - Total: 94.14 km^{2} (36.35 sq mi)
- Elevation: 32 m (105 ft)

Population (2025-12-31)
  - Total: 6,686
  - Density: 71.02/km^{2} (183.9/sq mi)
- Time zone: UTC+01:00 (CET)
  - Summer (DST): UTC+02:00 (CEST)
- Postal codes: 19306
- Dialling codes: 038757
- Vehicle registration: LUP, HGN, LBZ, LWL, PCH, STB
- Website: www.neustadt-glewe.de

Neustadt-Glewe (German pronunciation: [ˈnɔʏʃtat ˈɡleːvə]) is a town in state of Mecklenburg-Western Pomerania, in the district of Ludwigslust-Parchim, Germany.

== History ==
Neustadt-Glewe was mentioned for the first time in a document in 1248.

Neustadt-Glewe was the site of a Nazi concentration camp (1944–1945) "KZ Neustadt-Glewe". Among its prisoners was Stanisława Rachwałowa, a Polish resistance fighter transferred from Auschwitz-Birkenau.

Hans Axel Holm, a Swedish writer and journalist, documented life in Neustadt-Glewe in the late 1960s when it was part of the German Democratic Republic. In his book The Other Germans: Report From an East German Town, Holm documented various aspects of everyday life in the GDR, such as being an adult who worked at a VEB (industrial state-owned enterprise) or at an LPG (collective farm); being a child or teen going to school and participating in the FDJ (youth organization); being a soldier in the NVA (army); the GDR's relationship with the Soviets, including tensions within the Eastern Bloc and the threat of Soviet interventions; recreation; housing; socialist ideology and administration; the Nazi era and its consequences; interaction with West Germans, including the themes of who left the East, who stayed, and who came to the East; and other topics. LPG farming was big business in the Ludwigslust-Parchim region at the time, and the factories in the area included a large tannery (VEB Lederwerk "August Apfelbaum", which had formerly been a large plant of Adler and Oppenheimer), a hydraulic parts factory (for VEB Hydraulik Nord), and a factory for radio parts and telephone switchboard parts (for VEB Funkmechanik).

== Sights and monuments ==
- The Alte Burg, a 13th-century castle, considered to be the oldest military castle in Mecklenburg.
- The Schloss (palace), completed in 1720 in Baroque style, today a hotel.
- Monument to victims of Neustadt-Glewe German-Nazi Concentration Camp

== Population development ==
- 1855: 1,880
- 1890: 1,743
- 1925: 3,202
- 1984: 7,500
- 1995: 7,542
- 2010: 6,547
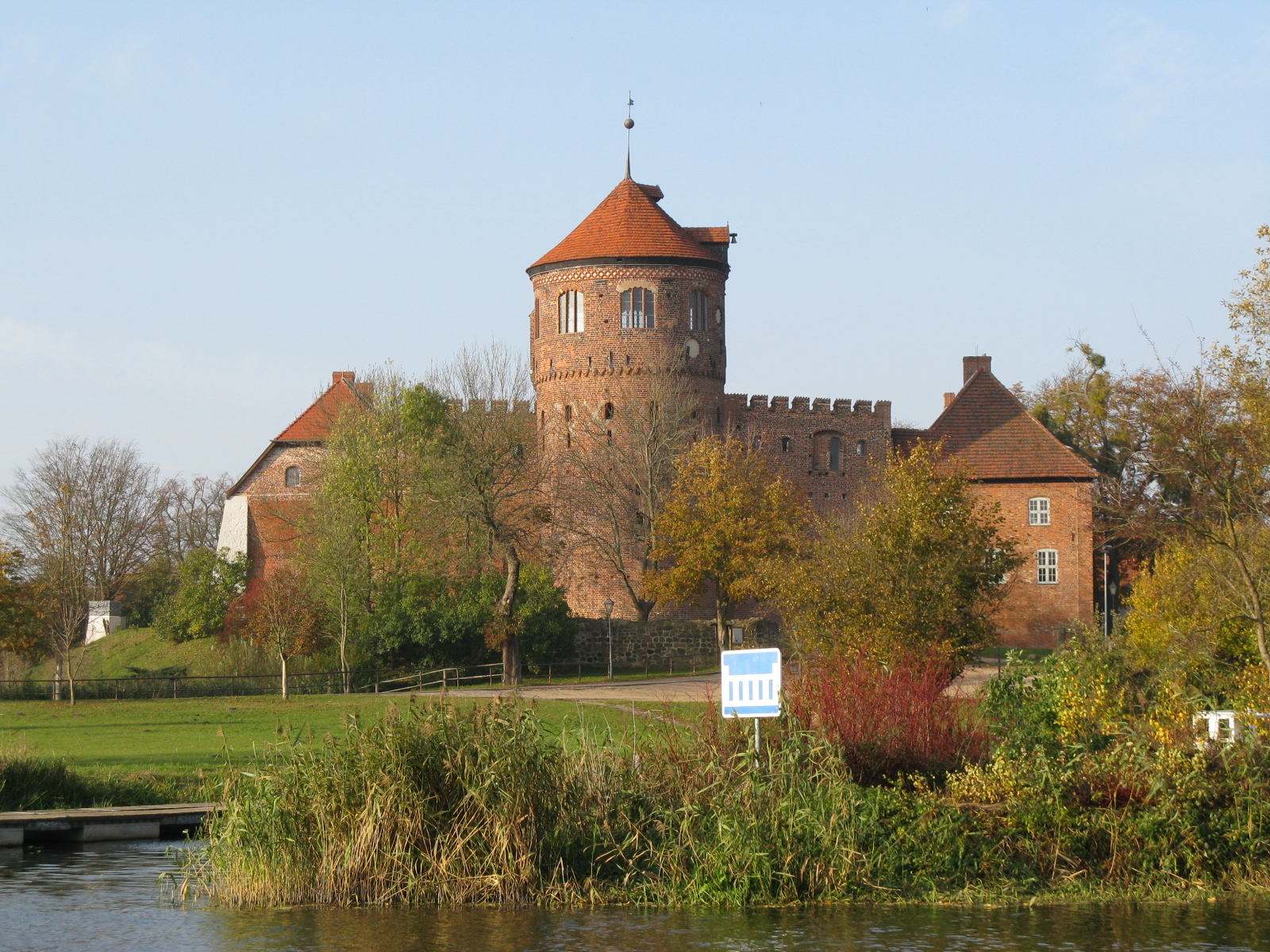
Alte Burg (Old Castle)

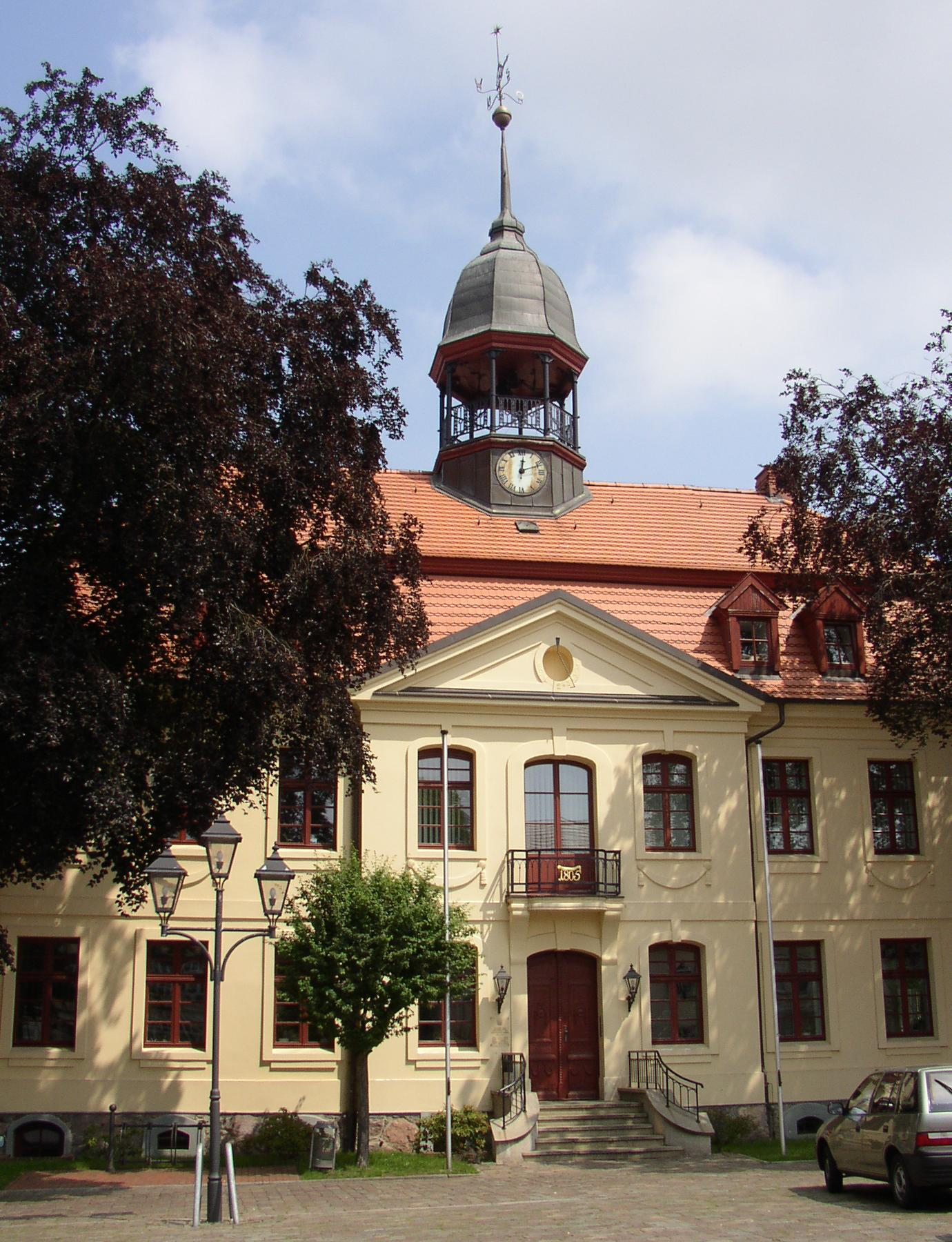
Town hall

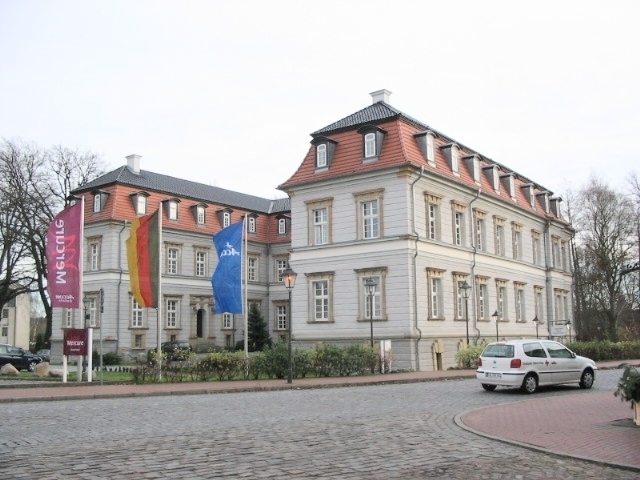
Neues Schloss (New Château)

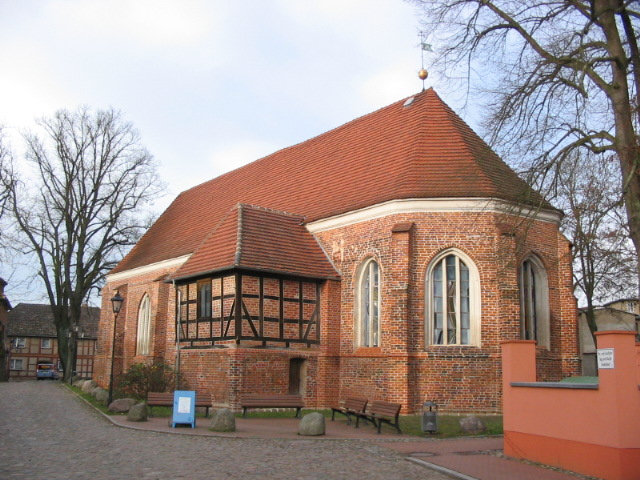
Church St. Marien

== Transport ==
The Neustadt-Glewe railway station is served by the regional train line RB 14 (Hagenow Stadt–Parchim). There are connections to long-distance transport Berlin – Hamburg as well as regional transport to Schwerin and Wittenberge via the Ludwigslust railway station.
