= Holthusen =

- Municipality
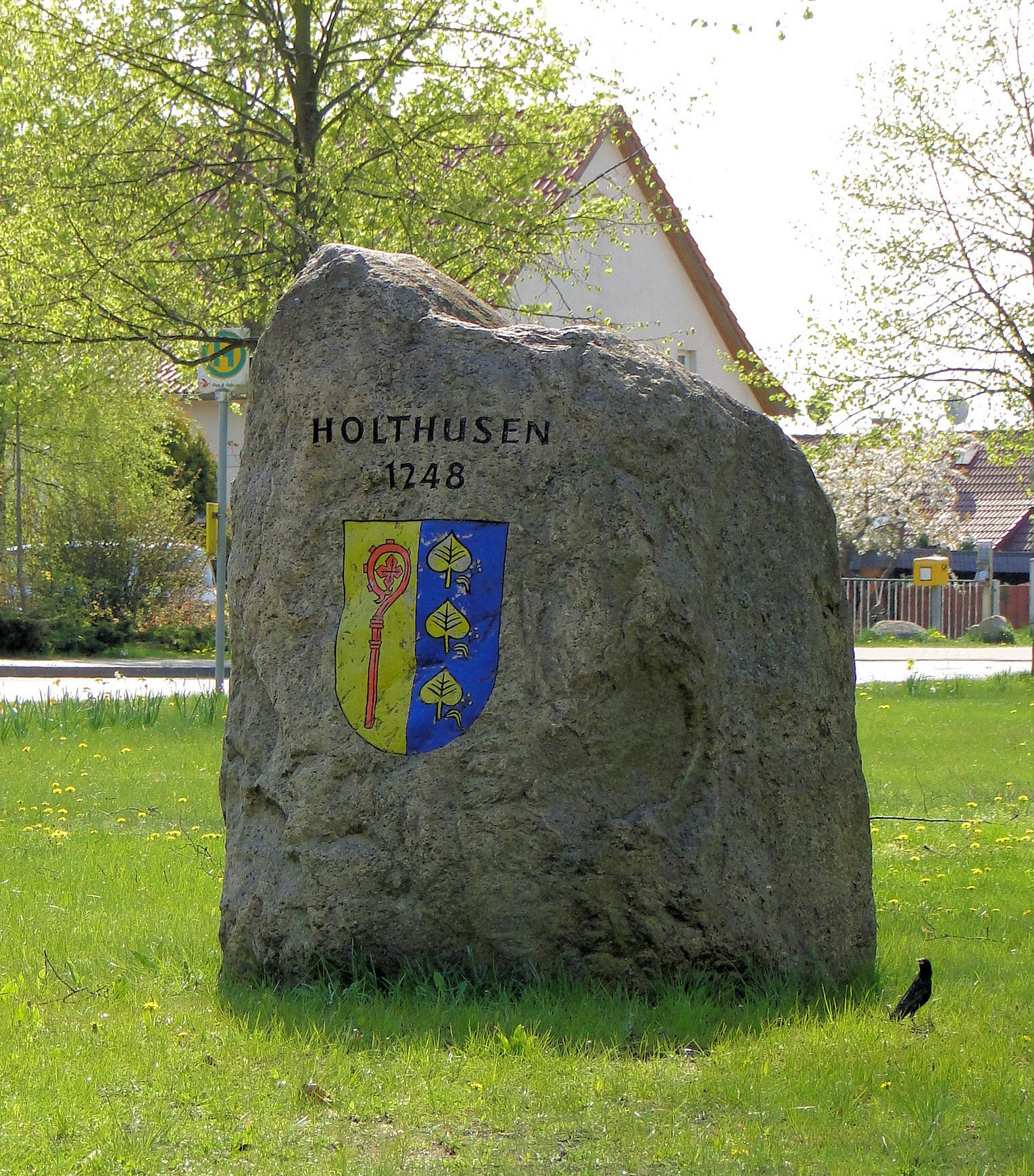

- Coat of arms

- Location of Holthusen within Ludwigslust-Parchim district
- Interactive map of Holthusen
- Location within Germany Location within Mecklenburg-Vorpommern
- Coordinates: 53°32′N 11°20′E
- Country: Germany
- State: Mecklenburg-Vorpommern
- District: Ludwigslust-Parchim
- Municipal assoc.: Stralendorf
- Subdivisions: 4 Ortsteile

Government
  - Mayor: Christel Deichmann (SPD)

Area
  - Total: 20.58 km^{2} (7.95 sq mi)
- Elevation: 49 m (161 ft)

Population (2025-12-31)
  - Total: 977
  - Density: 47.5/km^{2} (123/sq mi)
- Time zone: UTC+01:00 (CET)
  - Summer (DST): UTC+02:00 (CEST)
- Postal codes: 19075
- Dialling codes: 03865
- Vehicle registration: LWL
- Website: www.gemeinde-holthusen.de

Holthusen is a municipality in the Ludwigslust-Parchim district, in Mecklenburg-Vorpommern, Germany.
