= Dietrich Monstadt =

German politician (born 1957)

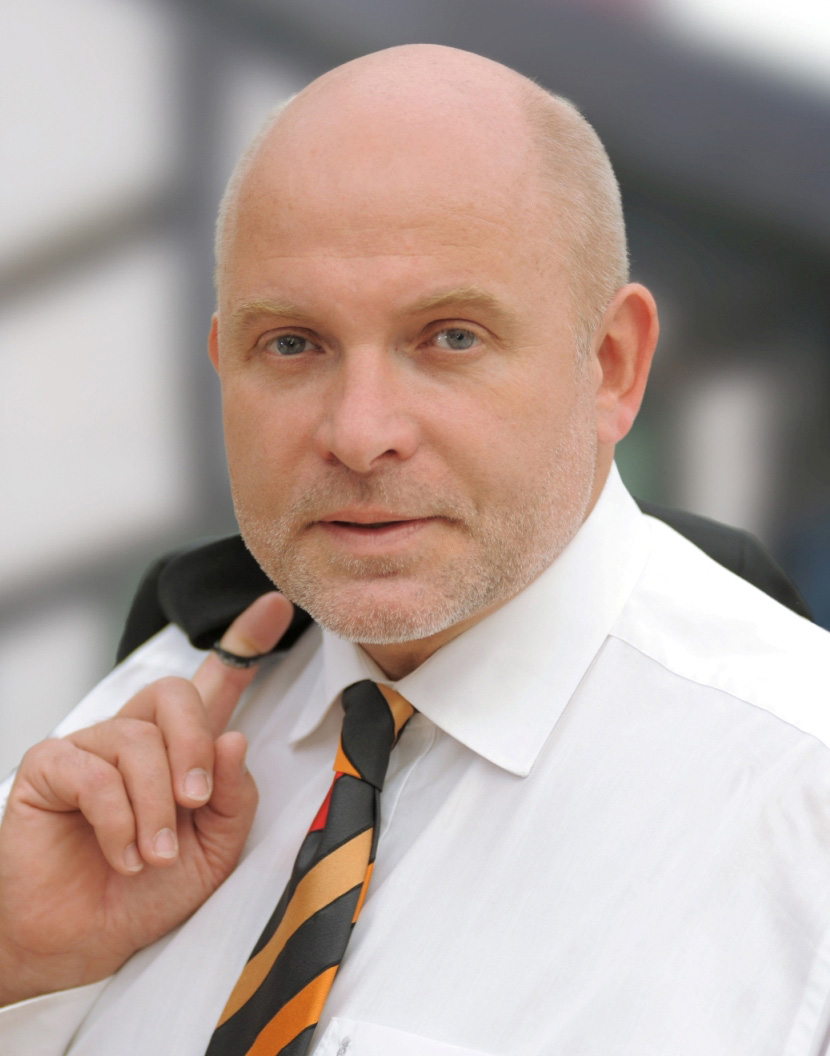
- Monstadt in 2010

Member of the Bundestag
- In office 27 October 2009 – 26 October 2021
- Preceded by: Hans-Joachim Hacker
- Succeeded by: Reem Alabali-Radovan
- Constituency: Schwerin – Ludwigslust (2009–2013); Schwerin – Ludwigslust-Parchim I – Nordwestmecklenburg I (2013–2021)

Personal details
- Born: 15 September 1957 (age 69) Bochum, West Germany
- Party: Christian Democratic Union
- Children: 4
- Education: Ruhr University Bochum

Dietrich Monstadt (born 15 September 1957) is a German politician of the Christian Democratic Union (CDU) who has been serving as a member of the Bundestag from the state of Mecklenburg-Vorpommern since 2009. He was born in Bochum, North Rhine-Westphalia.

== Political career ==
Monstadt has been a member of the Bundestag since the 2009 German federal election. He serves as on the Health Committee, where he is his parliamentary group's rapporteur on diabetes and obesity.

== Political positions ==
Ahead of the Christian Democrats’ leadership election in 2018, Monstadt publicly endorsed Jens Spahn to succeed Angela Merkel as the party's chair.

He lost his constituency at the 2021 German federal election but was re-elected on the state list.
