= Hans-Joachim Hacker =

Former member of the Bundestag

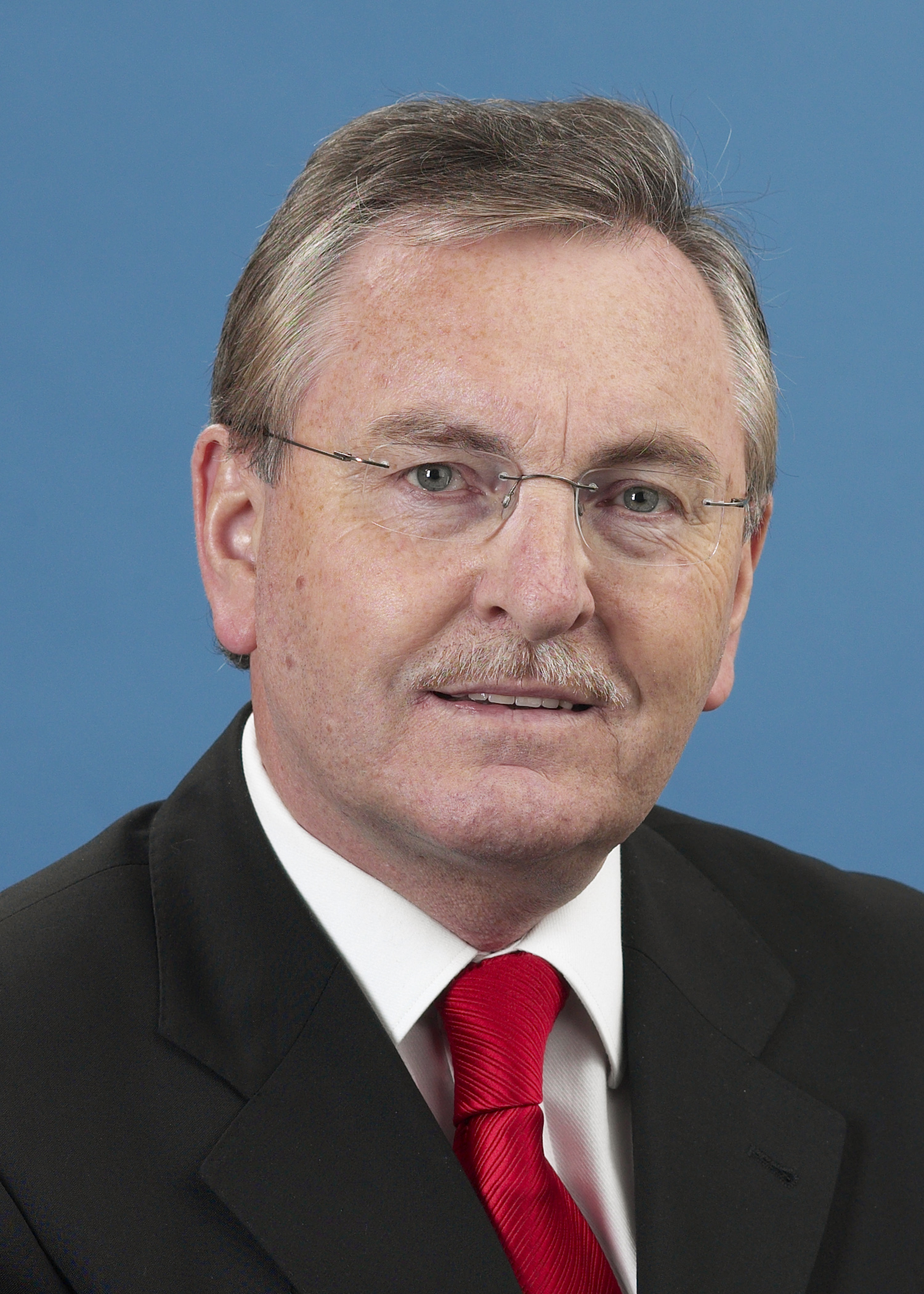
- Hacker in 2009

Member of the Bundestag; from Mecklenburg-Vorpommern
- In office 3 October 1990 – 22 October 2013
- Preceded by: Constituency established
- Succeeded by: Dietrich Monstadt
- Constituency: Volkskammer (1990); State list (1990–1994); Schwerin – Hagenow (1994–2002); Schwerin – Ludwigslust (2002–2009)

Member of the Volkskammer; for Schwerin
- In office 18 March 1990 – 2 October 1990
- Preceded by: Constituency established
- Succeeded by: Constituency abolished

Personal details
- Born: 10 October 1949 (age 77) Teltow, East Germany
- Party: Social Democratic (since 1990)
- Other political affiliations: SPD in the GDR (1989–1990)
- Spouse: Christine Lambrecht (m. 2015; div. 2019)
- Children: 5
- Education: Martin Luther University Halle-Wittenberg
- Committees: Committee for Transport, Construction, and Urban Development; Committee for Tourism
- Awards: Federal Cross of Merit

Hans-Joachim Hacker (born 10 October 1949) is a German politician and former member of the Bundestag. He graduated from Martin Luther University Halle-Wittenberg in 1973 with a diploma in commercial law. Between 1973 and 1990, Hacker was head of the legal department at a state-owned food processing plant. In 1989, he joined the SDP, which merged with the SPD one year later. He was elected to the People's Chamber of the GDR in 1990 and automatically joined the Bundestag following German reunification. He lost the 2013 election and retired from the Bundestag.

== Early life and education ==
Hacker was born on 10 October 1949 in Teltow district near Potsdam, then part of East Germany. He completed Oberschule in 1966 and enrolled in vocational training for mechanical engineering. Hacker graduated from his vocational training in 1969 with university entrance qualifications in agricultural industrial plant construction. He graduated from Martin Luther University Halle-Wittenberg in 1973 with a diploma in commercial law.

== Pre-political career ==
In 1973, Hacker was hired as a legal adviser at the state-owned VEB Kombinat Obst, Gemüse und Speisekartoffeln (English: VEB Processing Plant for Fruit, Vegetables, and Potatoes) in Bezirk Schwerin. He served as a legal adviser and head of the legal department until 1990.

== Local politics ==
Hacker joined the newly-formed East German SDP in October 1989, which merged with the West German SPD in 1990. In February 1990, he was employed by the SPD as a district manager until his election to the Bundestag later that year.

In 1989 and 1990, he served as chairman of various local committees, including the Schwerin executive committee, the SPD's Schwerin local branch, and the regional executive committee of the SPD. In March 1990, Hacker was elected to the GDR People's Chamber, where he served for several months as Chairman of the Legal Affairs committee.

== Bundestag ==
As a member of the GDR People's Chamber, Hacker automatically became a member of the Bundestag upon German reunification. He ran for the SPD in the 1990 federal election, the first election in the newly united Germany. He ran via the state list for Mecklenburg-Western Pomerania. In the election, he was elected to the Bundestag, and he took his seat on 3 October 1990. From the next election onwards he ran directly for the constituency of Schwerin–Ludwigslust.

Hacker was a member of two committees during his time in the Bundestag: the Committee for Transport, Construction and Urban Development and the Committee for Tourism, both of which he joined in 2009. He was also the deputy leader of the SPD parliamentary group, or Fraktion.

In the 2013 election, Hacker was not re-elected and left the Bundestag.

== Other political activities ==
Hacker is the honorary president of the Schwerin State Traffic Safety Association Mecklenburg-Vorpommern. He is also a member of the Workers' Welfare Association and a deputy member the Broadcasting Council of Deutsche Welle.

== Awards ==
In 2008, Hacker was awarded the Federal Cross of Merit by Norbert Lammert, president of the Bundestag.

== Personal life ==
Hacker is Protestant. He married Christine Lambrecht in 2015 but divorced in 2019, and has five children.

Hacker is a member of the Schwerin Sports Club and the German-Polish Society of Mecklenburg-Vorpommern. He reportedly enjoys gardening and visited a rally for the Central Association of Horticulture in 2009.
