= Pampow =

- Municipality
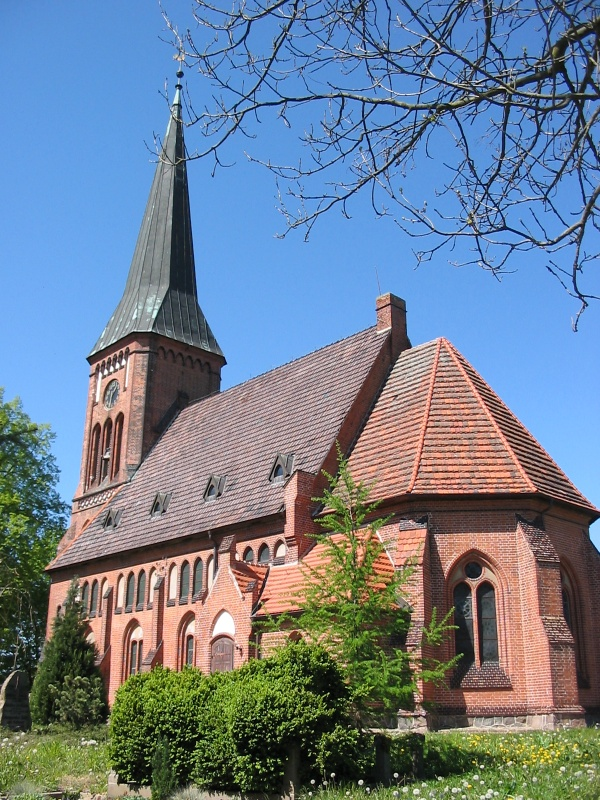
- Church in Pampow

- Coat of arms

- Location of Pampow within Ludwigslust-Parchim district
- Interactive map of Pampow
- Location within Germany Location within Mecklenburg-Vorpommern
- Coordinates: 53°34′N 11°22′E
- Country: Germany
- State: Mecklenburg-Vorpommern
- District: Ludwigslust-Parchim
- Municipal assoc.: Stralendorf

Government
  - Mayor: Hartwig Schulz (CDU)

Area
  - Total: 10.91 km^{2} (4.21 sq mi)
- Elevation: 54 m (177 ft)

Population (2025-12-31)
  - Total: 2,993
  - Density: 274.3/km^{2} (710.5/sq mi)
- Time zone: UTC+01:00 (CET)
  - Summer (DST): UTC+02:00 (CEST)
- Postal codes: 19075
- Dialling codes: 03865
- Vehicle registration: LWL
- Website: www.amt-stralendorf.de

Pampow is a municipality in the Ludwigslust-Parchim district, in Mecklenburg-Vorpommern, Germany.
