= Ina Latendorf =

German politician (born 1971)

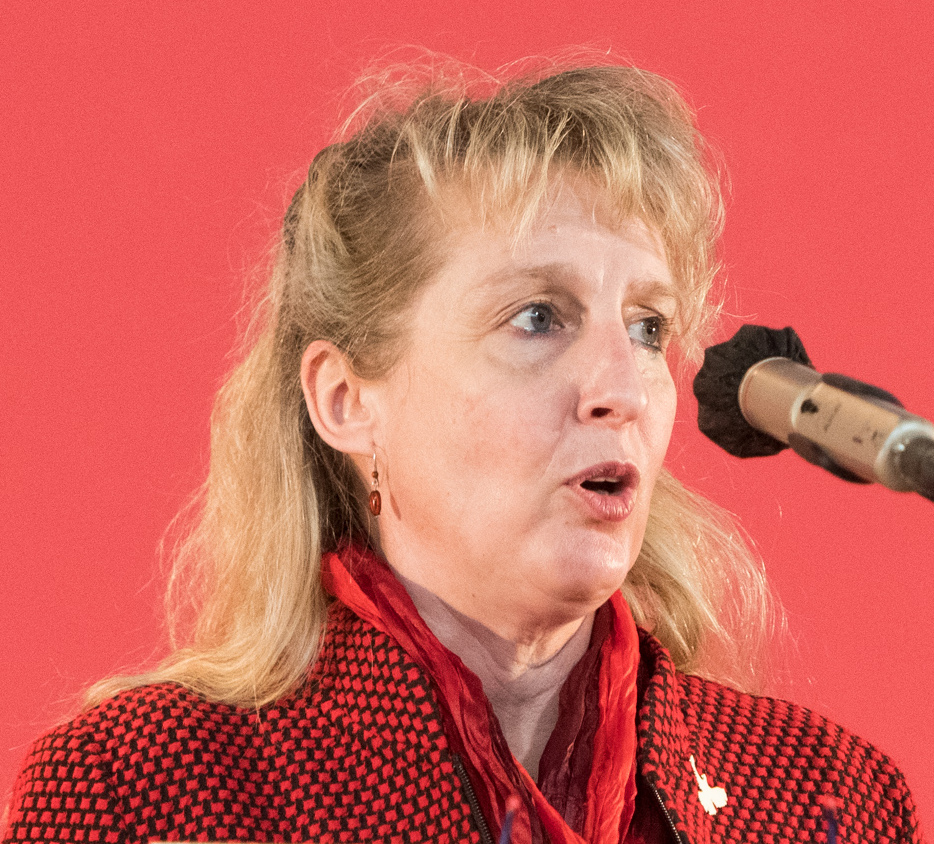
- Latendorf in 2021

Member of the German Bundestag
- Incumbent
- Assumed office 26 October 2021
- Constituency: List

Personal details
- Born: 16 June 1971 (age 55) Greifswald, Mecklenburg-Vorpommern, East Germany (now Germany)
- Party: Die Linke (since 2007)
- Other political affiliations: PDS (1990–2007)
- Education: University of Greifswald

Ina Latendorf (born 26 June 1971) is a German politician from Die Linke. She was elected to the Bundestag at the 2021 federal election.

She contested the constituency of Schwerin – Ludwigslust-Parchim I – Nordwestmecklenburg I in western Mecklenburg-Vorpommern but came in fourth place. Instead, she won her seat through the state list.

== See also ==
- List of members of the 20th Bundestag
