= Neustadt-Glewe station =

Railway station in Germany

Neustadt-Glewe
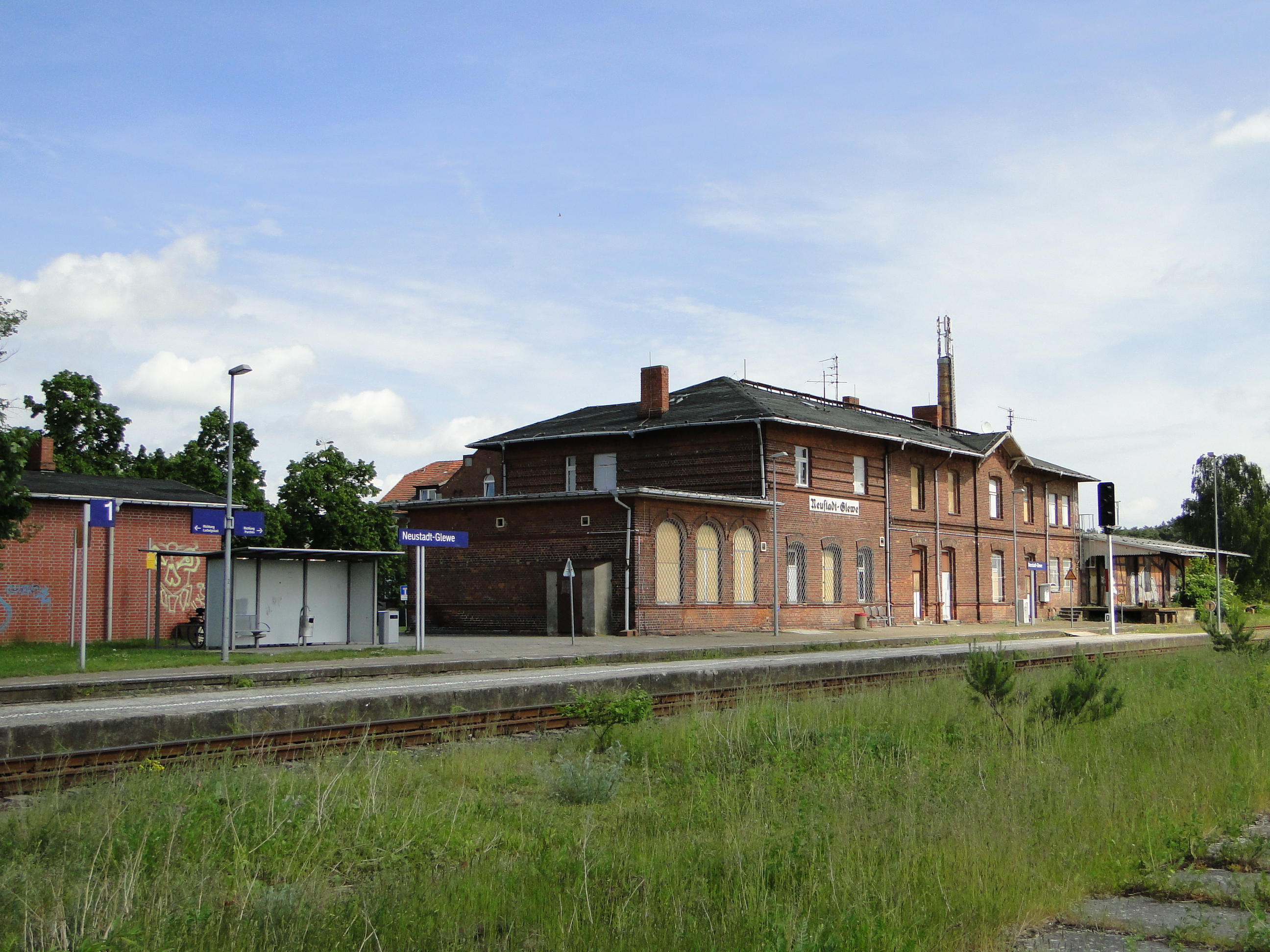
- 2010

General information
- Location: Bahnhof 1; 19306 Neustadt-Glewe; MV, Germany
- Coordinates: 53.3776°N 11.5937°E
- Owner: DB Netz
- Operator: DB Station&Service
- Lines: Parchim-Ludwigslust Railway (KBS 172)
- Platforms: 2 side platforms
- Tracks: 2
- Train operators: Ostdeutsche Eisenbahn

Other information
- Station code: 4457
- DS100 code: WNG
- IBNR: 8012474
- Category: 6
- Website: www.bahnhof.de

History
- Opened: 15 June 1880; 146 years ago

Services
| Preceding station | Ostdeutsche Eisenbahn | Following station |
|---|---|---|
| Groß Laasch towards Hagenow Stadt | RB 14 | Dütschow towards Parchim |
Location
- Location within Mecklenburg-Vorpommern

Neustadt-Glewe station is a railway station in the municipality of Neustadt-Glewe, located in the Ludwigslust-Parchim district in Mecklenburg-Vorpommern, Germany.
