= Stralendorf (Amt) =

Comune site in Germany

- Amt
- Map of Ludwigslust-Parchim highlighting Stralendorf
- Interactive map of Stralendorf
- Location within Germany Location within Mecklenburg-Vorpommern
- Coordinates: 53°35′N 11°18′E
- Country: Germany
- State: Mecklenburg-Vorpommern
- District: Ludwigslust-Parchim
- Seat: Stralendorf
- Subdivisions: 9 municipalities

Area
  - Total: 131.93 km^{2} (50.94 sq mi)

Population (2025-12-31)
  - Total: 11,711
  - Density: 88.767/km^{2} (229.90/sq mi)
- Time zone: UTC+01:00 (CET)
  - Summer (DST): UTC+02:00 (CEST)
- Website: www.amt-stralendorf.de

Stralendorf is an Amt in the Ludwigslust-Parchim district, in Mecklenburg-Vorpommern, Germany. The seat of the Amt is in Stralendorf.

The Amt Stralendorf consists of the following municipalities:

1. Dümmer
2. Holthusen
3. Klein Rogahn
4. Pampow
5. Schossin
6. Stralendorf
7. Warsow
8. Wittenförden
9. Zülow
