= Brenz, Mecklenburg-Vorpommern =

Brenz
- Municipality
- Coat of arms

- Location of Brenz within Ludwigslust-Parchim district
- Interactive map of Brenz
- Location within Germany Location within Mecklenburg-Vorpommern
- Coordinates: 53°22′N 11°39′E
- Country: Germany
- State: Mecklenburg-Vorpommern
- District: Ludwigslust-Parchim
- Municipal assoc.: Neustadt-Glewe
- Subdivisions: 2

Government
  - Mayor: Martin Just

Area
  - Total: 12.39 km^{2} (4.78 sq mi)
- Elevation: 49 m (161 ft)

Population (2025-12-31)
  - Total: 486
  - Density: 39.2/km^{2} (102/sq mi)
- Time zone: UTC+01:00 (CET)
  - Summer (DST): UTC+02:00 (CEST)
- Postal codes: 19306
- Dialling codes: 038757
- Vehicle registration: LWL
- Website: www.neustadt-glewe.de

Brenz (German pronunciation: [bʁɛnt͡s]) is a municipality in the Ludwigslust-Parchim district, in Mecklenburg-Vorpommern, Germany.
