= Stralendorf =

- Municipality
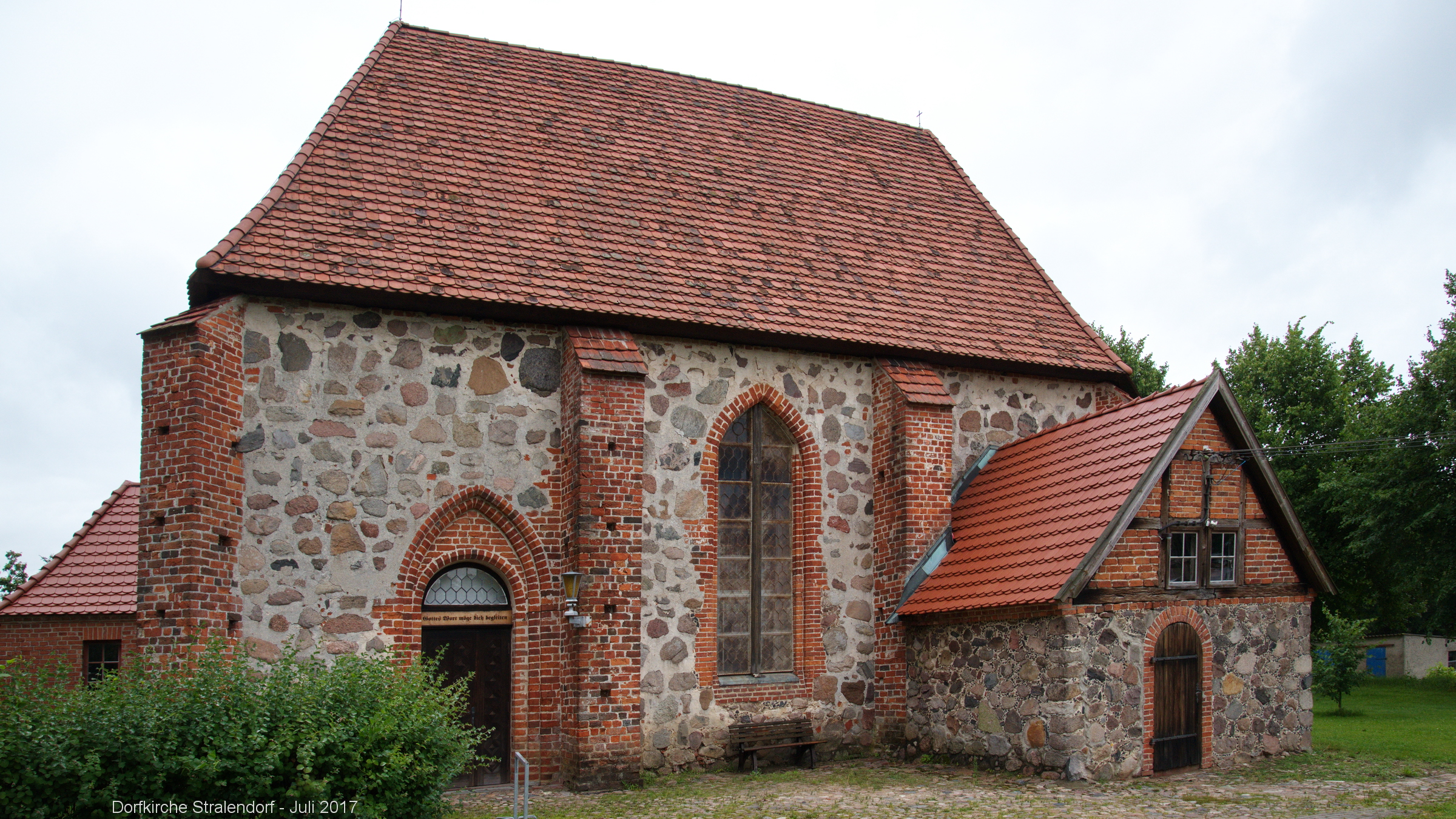
- Medieval village church in Stralendorf

- Coat of arms

- Location of Stralendorf within Ludwigslust-Parchim district
- Interactive map of Stralendorf
- Location within Germany Location within Mecklenburg-Vorpommern
- Coordinates: 53°35′N 11°18′E
- Country: Germany
- State: Mecklenburg-Vorpommern
- District: Ludwigslust-Parchim
- Municipal assoc.: Stralendorf

Government
  - Mayor: Peter Lenz

Area
  - Total: 12.02 km^{2} (4.64 sq mi)
- Elevation: 56 m (184 ft)

Population (2025-12-31)
  - Total: 1,374
  - Density: 114.3/km^{2} (296.1/sq mi)
- Time zone: UTC+01:00 (CET)
  - Summer (DST): UTC+02:00 (CEST)
- Postal codes: 19073
- Dialling codes: 03865, 03869
- Vehicle registration: LWL
- Website: www.stralendorf.de

Stralendorf is a municipality in the Ludwigslust-Parchim district, in Mecklenburg-Vorpommern, Germany.
