= Blievenstorf =

- Municipality
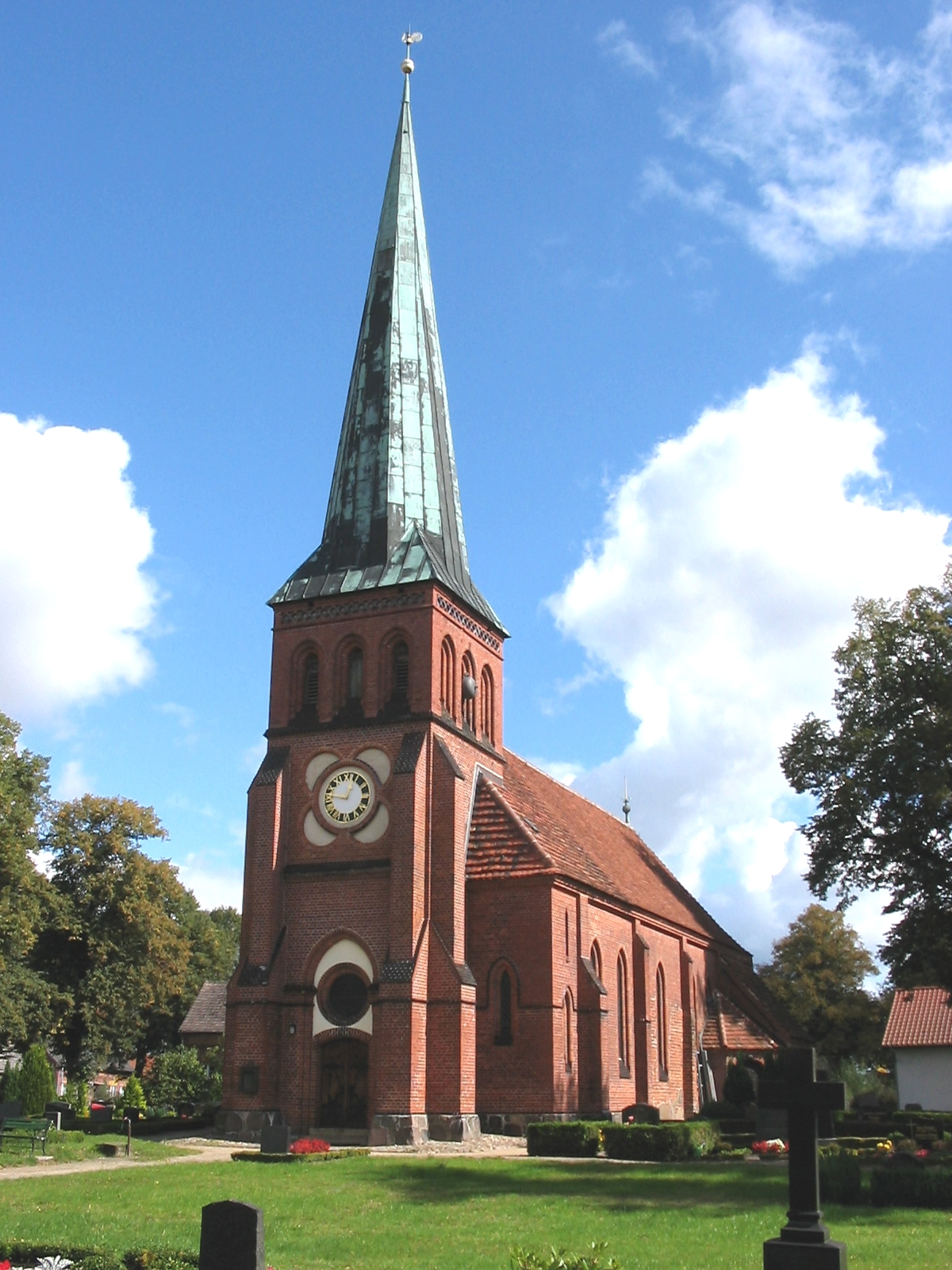
- Blievenstorf Church

- Location of Blievenstorf within Ludwigslust-Parchim district
- Interactive map of Blievenstorf
- Location within Germany Location within Mecklenburg-Vorpommern
- Coordinates: 53°21′N 11°39′E
- Country: Germany
- State: Mecklenburg-Vorpommern
- District: Ludwigslust-Parchim
- Municipal assoc.: Neustadt-Glewe

Government
  - Mayor: Hans-Dieter Schult

Area
  - Total: 21.39 km^{2} (8.26 sq mi)
- Elevation: 44 m (144 ft)

Population (2025-12-31)
  - Total: 430
  - Density: 20/km^{2} (52/sq mi)
- Time zone: UTC+01:00 (CET)
  - Summer (DST): UTC+02:00 (CEST)
- Postal codes: 19306
- Dialling codes: 038757
- Vehicle registration: LWL
- Website: www.neustadt-glewe.de

Blievenstorf is a municipality in the Ludwigslust-Parchim district, in Mecklenburg-Vorpommern, Germany.
