= Neustadt-Glewe (Amt) =

- Amt
- Map of Ludwigslust-Parchim highlighting Neustadt-Glewe
- Interactive map of Neustadt-Glewe
- Location within Germany Location within Mecklenburg-Vorpommern
- Coordinates: 53°22′N 11°35′E
- Country: Germany
- State: Mecklenburg-Vorpommern
- District: Ludwigslust-Parchim
- Seat: Neustadt-Glewe
- Subdivisions: 3 municipalities

Area
  - Total: 128.25 km^{2} (49.52 sq mi)

Population (2025-12-31)
  - Total: 7,602
  - Density: 59.27/km^{2} (153.5/sq mi)
- Time zone: UTC+01:00 (CET)
  - Summer (DST): UTC+02:00 (CEST)
- Website: www.neustadt-glewe.de

Neustadt-Glewe is an Amt in the Ludwigslust-Parchim district, in Mecklenburg-Vorpommern, Germany. The seat of the Amt is in Neustadt-Glewe.

The Amt Neustadt-Glewe consists of the following municipalities:

1. Blievenstorf
2. Brenz
3. Neustadt-Glewe
