= Neustadt (Amt) =

Neustadt (Dosse)
- Amt
- Map of Ostprignitz-Ruppin highlighting Neustadt (Dosse)
- Interactive map of Neustadt (Dosse)
- Location within Germany Location within Brandenburg
- Coordinates: 52°51′N 12°27′E
- Country: Germany
- State: Brandenburg
- District: Ostprignitz-Ruppin
- Seat: Neustadt
- Subdivisions: 6 municipalities

Area
  - Total: 267.33 km^{2} (103.22 sq mi)

Population (2025-12-31)
  - Total: 7,612
  - Density: 28.47/km^{2} (73.75/sq mi)
- Time zone: UTC+01:00 (CET)
  - Summer (DST): UTC+02:00 (CEST)
- Website: www.neustadt-dosse.de

Amt Neustadt (Dosse) is an amt (collective municipality) in the district of Ostprignitz-Ruppin, in Brandenburg, Germany. Its seat is Neustadt (Dosse).

The Amt Neustadt (Dosse) consists of the following municipalities:

1. Breddin
2. Dreetz
3. Neustadt (Dosse)
4. Sieversdorf-Hohenofen
5. Stüdenitz-Schönermark
6. Zernitz-Lohm

== Demography ==
Development of population since 1875 within the current Boundaries (Blue Line: Population; Dotted Line: Comparison to Population development in Brandenburg state; Grey Background: Time of Nazi Germany; Red Background: Time of communist East Germany)

Recent Population Development and Projections (Population Development before Census 2011 (blue line); Recent Population Development according to the Census in Germany in 2011 (blue bordered line); Official projections for 2005-2030 (yellow line); for 2017-2030 (scarlet line); for 2020-2030 (green line)

Amt Neustadt (Dosse): Population development
within the current boundaries (2020)

Year	Pop.	±% p.a.
1875	11,910	—
1890	11,518	−0.22%
1910	10,748	−0.35%
1925	11,375	+0.38%
1939	11,017	−0.23%
1950	16,406	+3.69%
1964	12,337	−2.02%
1971	11,690	−0.77%
1981	10,237	−1.32%

Year	Pop.	±% p.a.
1985	10,021	−0.53%
1990	9,687	−0.68%
1995	9,433	−0.53%
2000	9,079	−0.76%
2005	8,624	−1.02%
2010	8,062	−1.34%
2015	7,657	−1.03%
2020	7,620	−0.10%
2025	7,612	−0.02%
