= Zernitz station =

Former railway station in Zernitz-Lohm, Germany

Zernitz
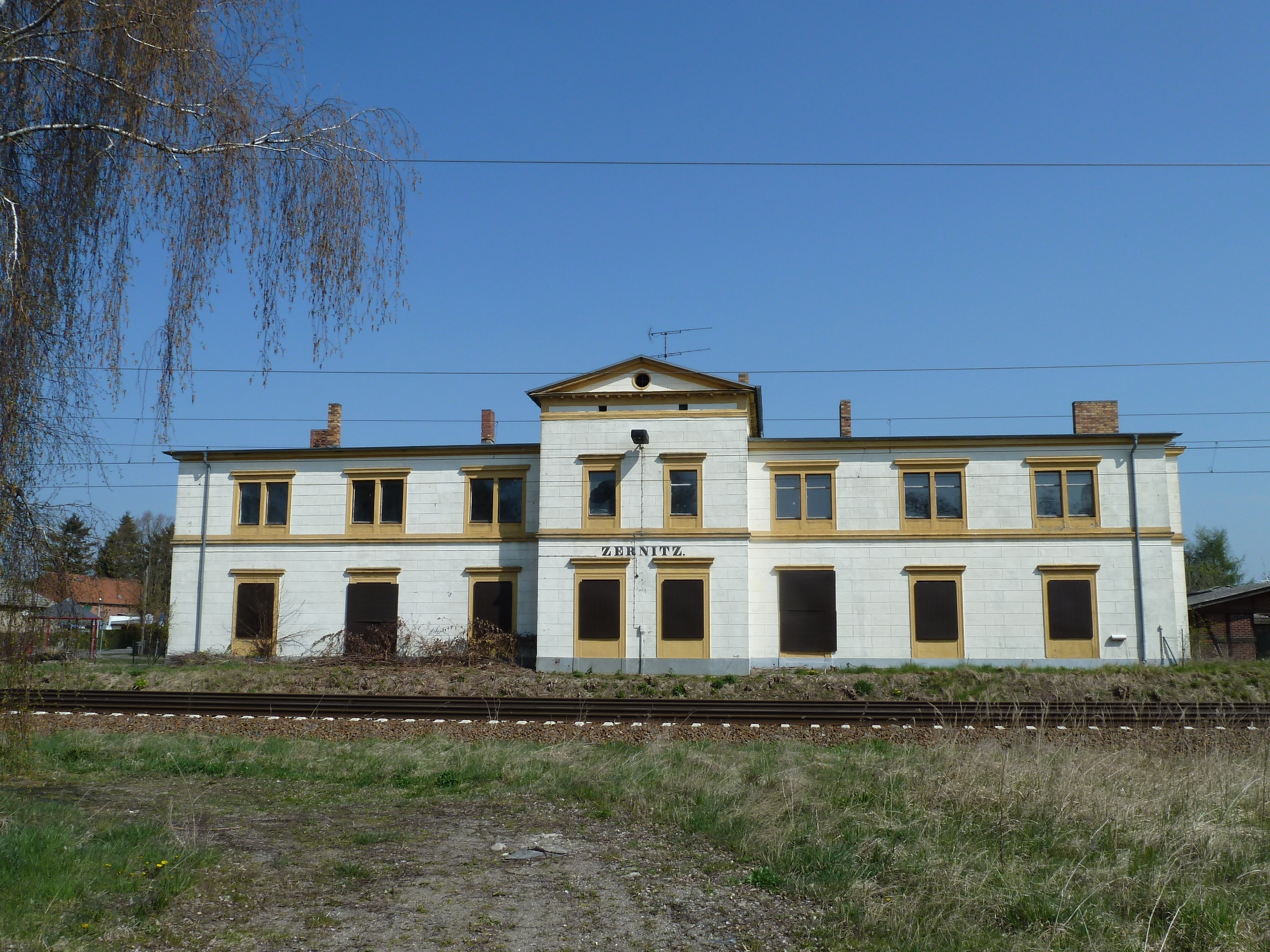
- Entrance building, track side

General information
- Location: Germany
- Coordinates: 52°53′29″N 12°21′04″E
- System: Through station

Construction
- Architect: Friedrich Neuhaus; Ferdinand Wilhelm Holz

Other information
- Station code: n/a
- DS100 code: WZR

History
- Closed: 1995
Location
- Location within Brandenburg

Zernitz station is a former station on the Berlin–Hamburg Railway. The station opened in 1846 and is one of the oldest in the German state of Brandenburg. Originally it was used mainly to connect to the town of Kyritz. Next to the station, which had originally been built on an open field, a settlement subsequently developed that was also called Bahnhof Zernitz or Zernitz-Bahnhof (Zernitz station). The station was closed in 1995. The station building, which was built with the original construction of the railway, has heritage protection, as does the burial site of 48 Jewish concentration camp prisoners in the south of the village. They were killed in 1945 when a prisoner transport was accidentally strafed in the station by American low-flying aircraft.

== Location ==
The station is located in Bahnhof Zernitz in the municipality of Zernitz-Lohm in the district of Ostprignitz-Ruppin, about two kilometres west of the hamlet of Zernitz. It is located at km 83.5, measured from Berlin. The station was originally built to connect the town of Kyritz, which is located about six km north of the station.

== History ==
The original plans for the Berlin–Hamburg Railway proposed a route via Kyritz, then seat of the district of Ostprignitz. However, the realised route runs further south through Neustadt (Dosse) and Wittenberge. As a replacement, Kyritz received a station at Zernitz. The fact that the main purpose of the station was not to meet a few local needs but instead to provide connections from places in the area is evident from the location of the station on the road from Kyritz to Lohm, some distance from the village of Zernitz. The station was not only intended as a station for Kyritz, but was also to serve the much more distant Wittstock. In the 1880s, the railway facilities were extended and the entrance building was enlarged.

In 1887, the town of Kyritz received a direct rail connection with the opening of the Meyenburg–Neustadt (Dosse) railway, so that Zernitz station subsequently mainly served traffic to the surrounding villages.

On 16 April 1945, a train carrying Jewish prisoners, mainly originating from Hungary, from Bergen-Belsen concentration camp, who had been deported to Theresienstadt concentration camp, was accidentally strafed near the station by American low-flying aircraft. 48 prisoners were killed. They were buried in the southern outskirts and are remembered today by a memorial to their fate.

The station building was completely refurbished in 1990/91. Passenger trains have no longer stopped in the station since 1995. In the course of the renovation of the railway in the late 1990s, the station was also closed down operationally and the platforms, points and sidings were removed.

== Infrastructure ==
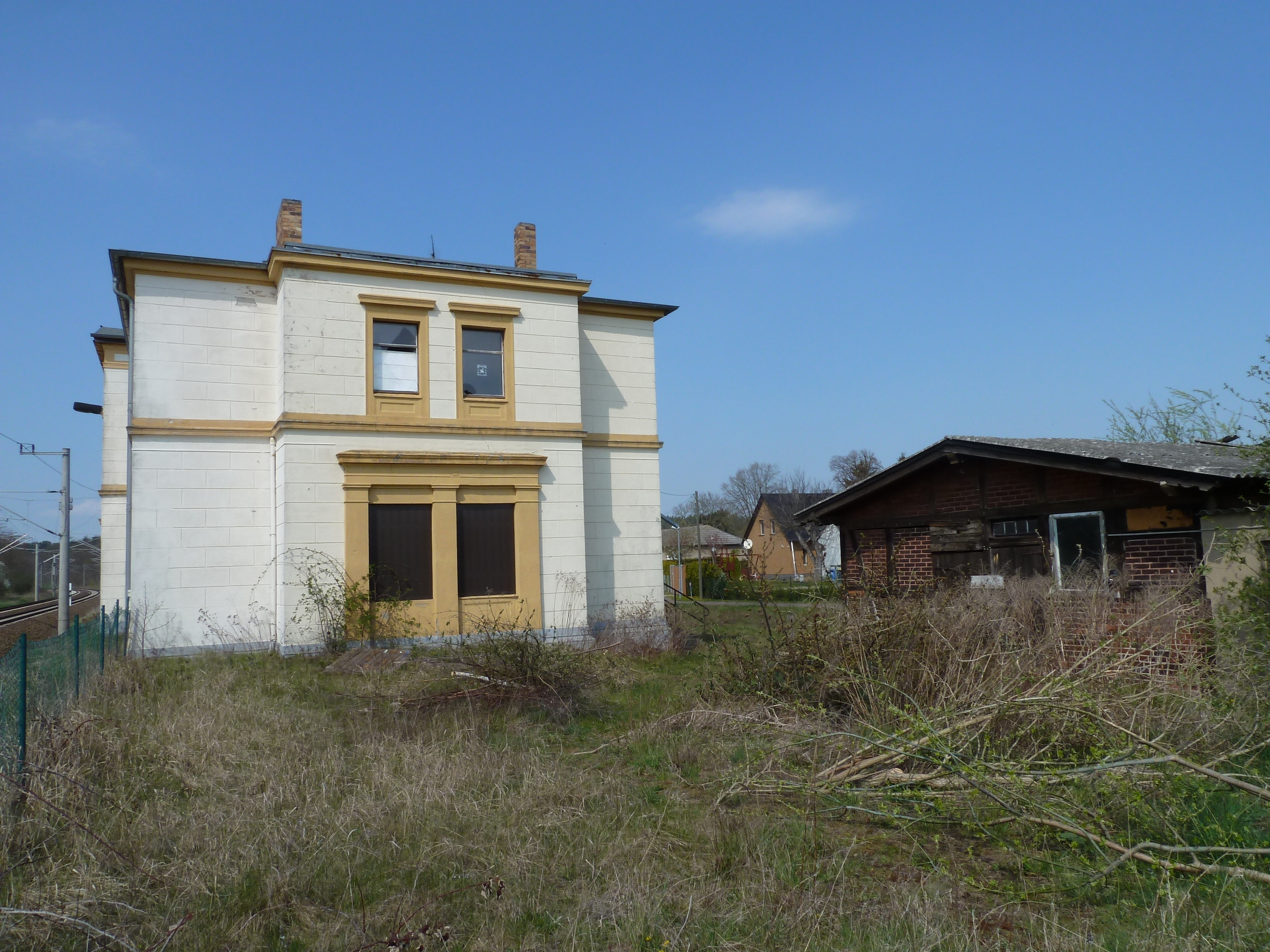
Station building and toilet block

The station building is located north of the railway line (on the side towards the town of Kyritz), although most of the district of Zernitz and Bahnhof Zernitz is located south of the track. Unlike most of the station buildings on the Berlin–Hamburg Railway, the two-storey building with a gabled roof initially had a cross-shaped ground plan, which on all sides had a triangular pediment with acroteria. The long sides had four portals with avant-corps, the lateral sides had three portals. The architects of the building with its "sober neoclassical plaster structure" were Friedrich Neuhaus (the planning director of the Berlin-Hamburg Railway) and Ferdinand Wilhelm Holz. The building was extended in the longitudinal direction, presumably in the late 1880s. Unlike other station buildings along the route that were extended during this period (such as Paulinenaue station), Zernitz station continued to be strictly symmetrical and its structure was limited to a few distinct forms. It has been preserved in this form until today.

In 1990/91, the building was extensively renovated with a large amount of yellow used around the windows. It was given heritage protection in 1993. Afterwards it continued to be used for residential purposes in the 1990s, but it stands empty today. Next to the station building there is a toilet block. South of the tracks is the goods shed, which was probably built in the 1880s. The ensemble is itemised as the "station building with toilet block and forecourt" on the list of historic monuments.

None of the railway tracks of the station, except the two through tracks, are preserved, but operationally Zernitz still serves as a block post.

=== District ===
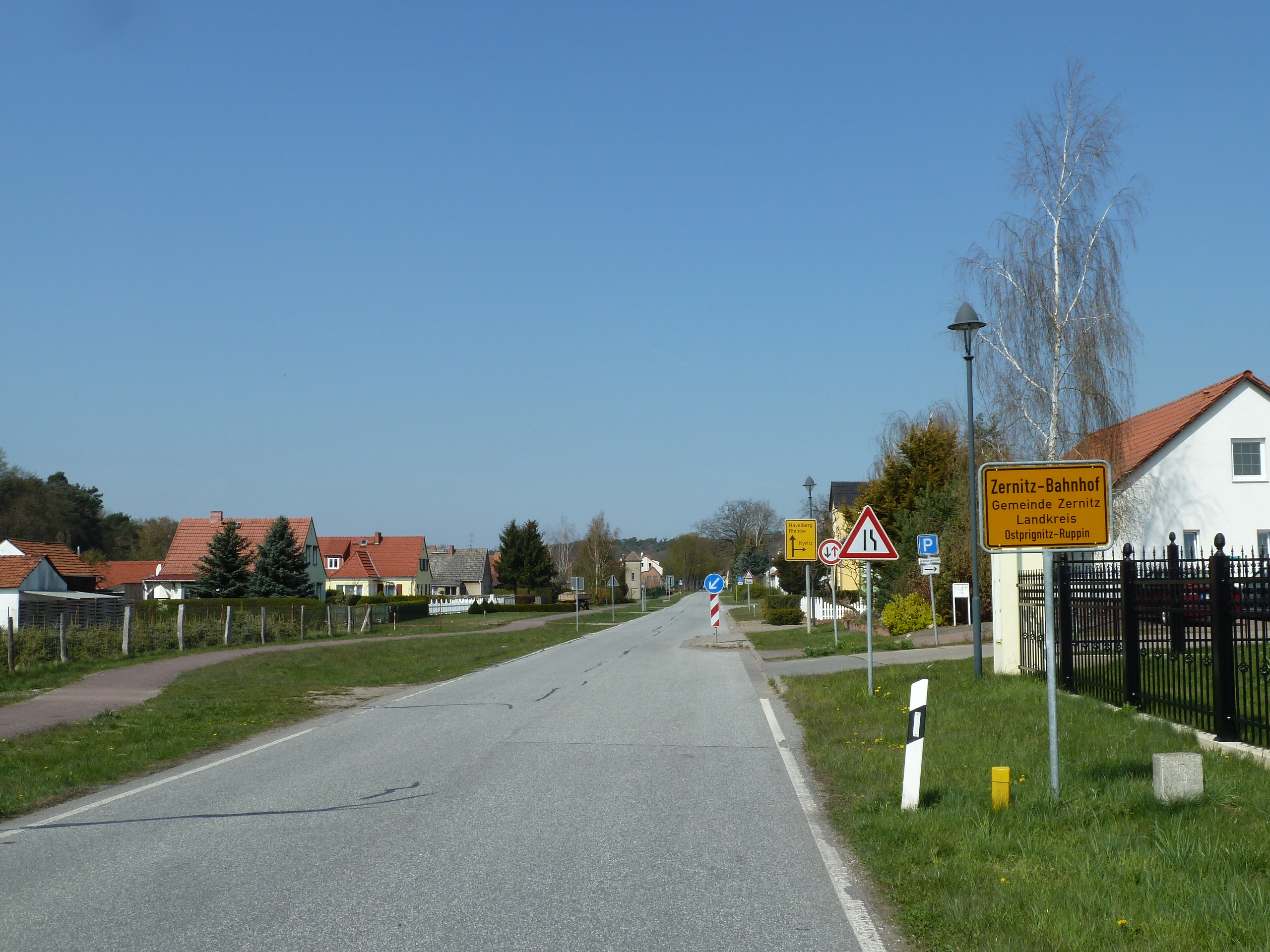
Stüdenitzer Straße in Zernitz-Bahnhof

The settlement around the station has been officially named Bahnhof Zernitz (Zernitz station), but on the entrance signs and in other places it also called Zernitz-Bahnhof. It was built only after the opening of the station. Mostly traders and businessmen settled here. The settlement belonged to the municipality of Zernitz, which was merged with the neighbouring municipality of Lohm to form the municipality of Zernitz-Lohm on 31 December 1997.

Two country roads, the L14 from Kyritz to Lohm and the L141 from Neustadt (Dosse) to Breddin, cross in the village.

Most of the houses of the settlement lie parallel to the railway line and south of it on Stüdenitzer Straße, but a few houses are grouped around the entrance building on the north side of the tracks. The road from Kyritz crossed the railway track on a level crossing west of the station. During the upgrade of the line, the crossing was closed and replaced by an underpass east of the station. South of the road there is a small grove containing a cemetery where this is a small memorial for the Jewish concentration camp prisoners.

=== Jewish cemetery ===
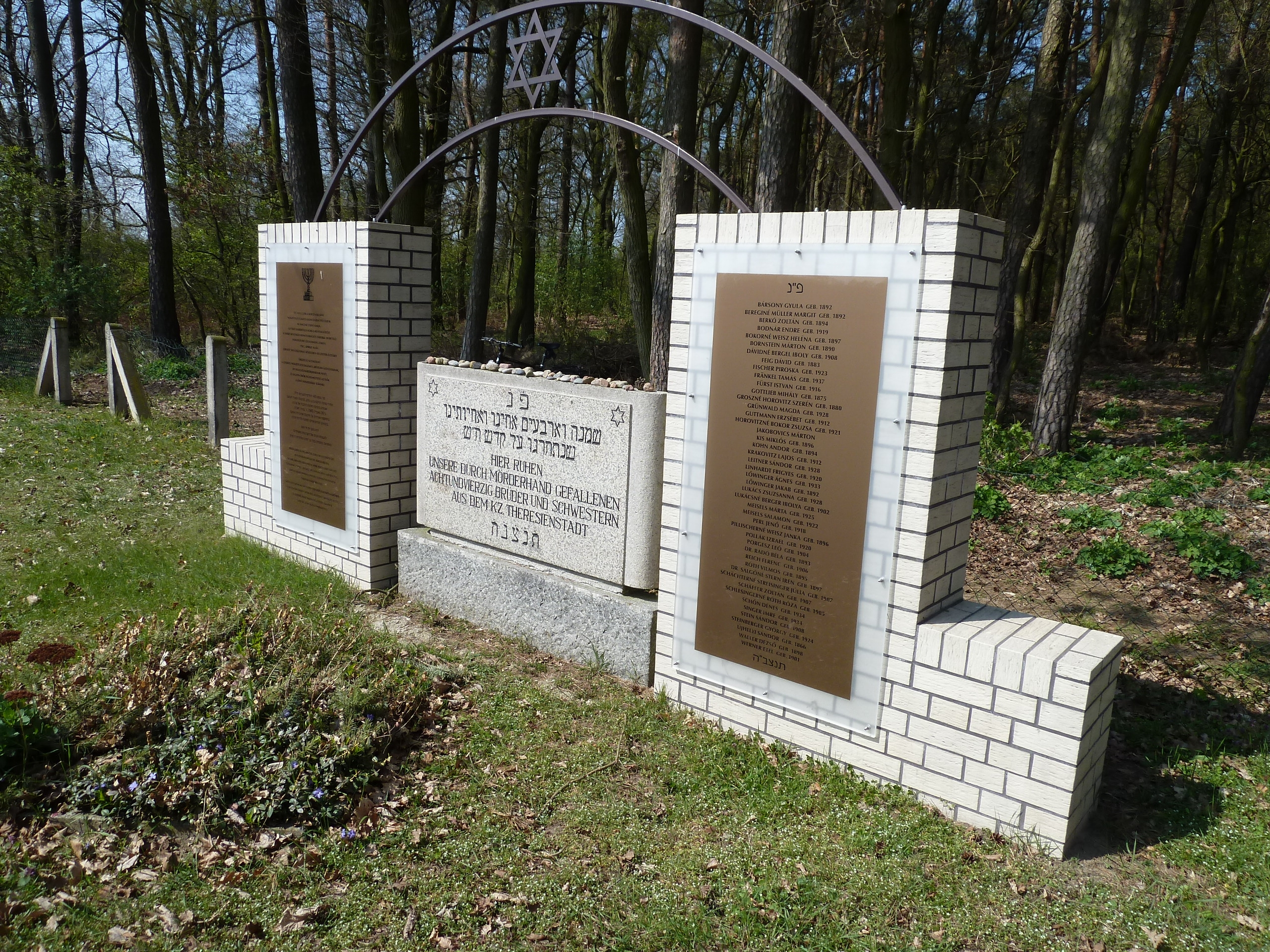
Zernitz memorial

The memorial for the murdered Jewish prisoners is a listed building. There is a memorial plaque in German and Hebrew to the victims:

Here lie our fallen at the hand of a killer, eight brothers and sisters from the Theresienstadt concentration camp.

Beside it is a description on another panel in German, Hebrew and Hungarian of the events and a third plaque gives the names of the dead. Apart from the actual memorial there is another grave for the Jewish lawyer Theodor Steigerwald, who died in 1947. He had been hiding from the Nazis during the war in the Kyritz area. Before his death he had made known his wish to be buried here also.
