= Lindow (Amt) =

Lindow (Mark)
- Amt
- Map of Ostprignitz-Ruppin highlighting Lindow (Mark)
- Interactive map of Lindow (Mark)
- Location within Germany Location within Brandenburg
- Coordinates: 52°58′N 12°59′E
- Country: Germany
- State: Brandenburg
- District: Ostprignitz-Ruppin
- Seat: Lindow
- Subdivisions: 4 municipalities

Area
  - Total: 124.07 km^{2} (47.90 sq mi)

Population (2025-12-31)
  - Total: 4,498
  - Density: 36.25/km^{2} (93.90/sq mi)
- Time zone: UTC+01:00 (CET)
  - Summer (DST): UTC+02:00 (CEST)
- Website: www.amt-lindow-mark.de

Amt Lindow (Mark) is an Amt ("collective municipality") in the district of Ostprignitz-Ruppin, in Brandenburg, Germany. Its seat is in Lindow.

The Amt Lindow (Mark) consists of the following municipalities:

1. Herzberg
2. Lindow
3. Rüthnick
4. Vielitzsee

== Demography ==
Development of population since 1875 within the current Boundaries (Blue Line: Population; Dotted Line: Comparison to Population development in Brandenburg state; Grey Background: Time of Nazi Germany; Red Background: Time of communist East Germany)

Recent Population Development and Projections (Population Development before Census 2011 (blue line); Recent Population Development according to the Census in Germany in 2011 (blue bordered line); Official projections for 2005-2030 (yellow line); for 2017-2030 (scarlet line); for 2020-2030 (green line)

Amt Lindow (Mark): Population development
within the current boundaries (2020)

| Year | Pop. | ±% p.a. |
|---|---|---|
| 1875 | 5,003 | — |
| 1890 | 4,830 | −0.23% |
| 1910 | 4,512 | −0.34% |
| 1925 | 4,880 | +0.52% |
| 1939 | 5,463 | +0.81% |
| 1950 | 7,748 | +3.23% |
| 1964 | 5,870 | −1.96% |
| 1971 | 5,996 | +0.30% |
| 1981 | 5,507 | −0.85% |

| Year | Pop. | ±% p.a. |
|---|---|---|
| 1985 | 5,422 | −0.39% |
| 1990 | 5,187 | −0.88% |
| 1995 | 5,122 | −0.25% |
| 2000 | 5,263 | +0.54% |
| 2005 | 5,059 | −0.79% |
| 2010 | 4,800 | −1.05% |
| 2015 | 4,538 | −1.12% |
| 2020 | 4,604 | +0.29% |
| 2025 | 4,498 | −0.46% |
