= Handmühlenmuseum =

German museum

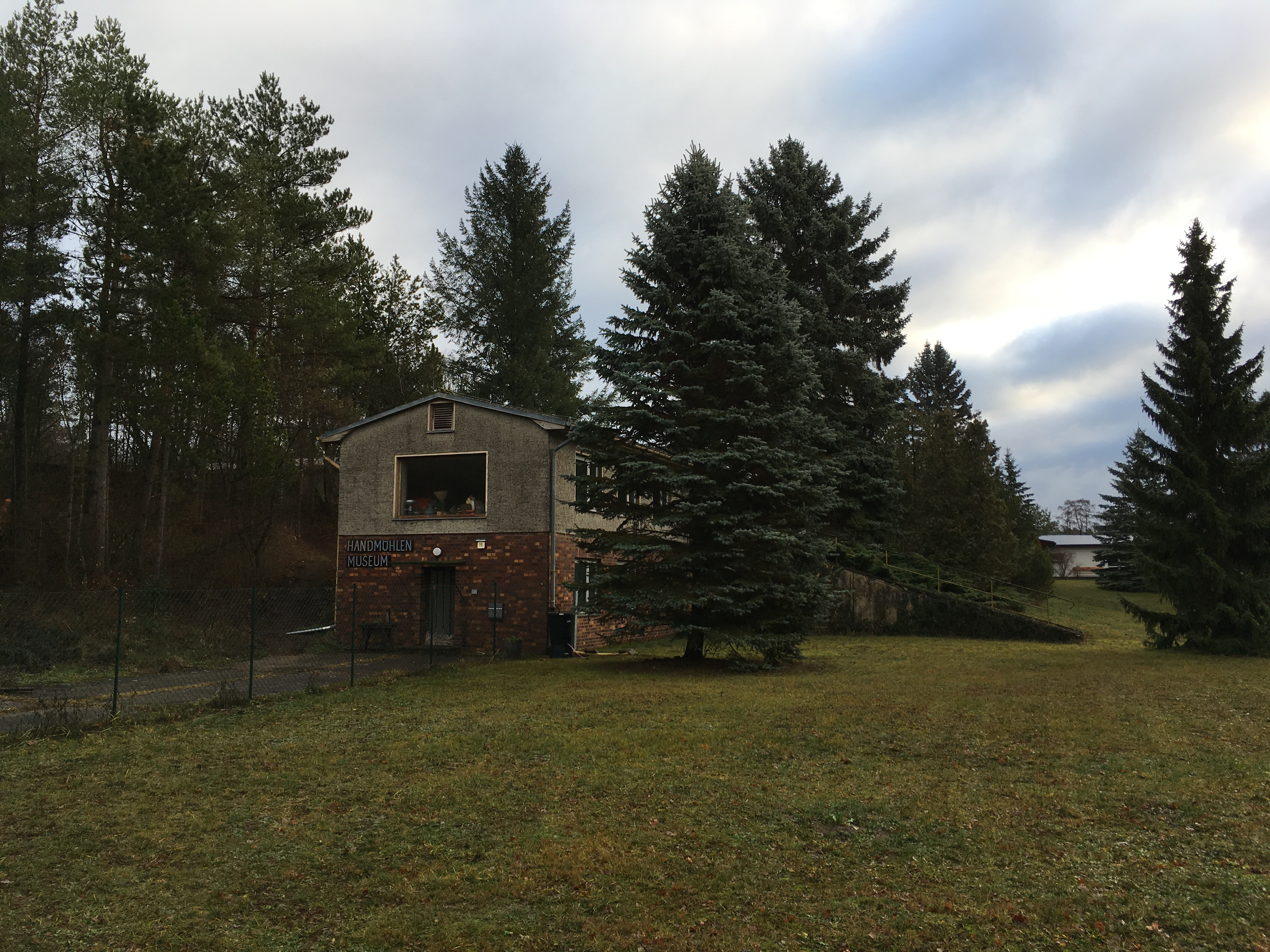
Handmühlenmuseum (Hand Mill Museum) in Kuhlmühle

Hand Mill Museum (Handmühlenmuseum) is a museum project in Kuhlmühle, part of Wittstock/Dosse in the Landkreis Ostprignitz-Ruppin of Brandenburg, Germany. It is dedicated to hand-operated mills and related manual machinery.

== Overview ==
The Hand Mill Museum is operated by the non-profit organisation Zentrum für soziale und ökologische Nachhaltigkeit, Permakultur und Naturverbundenheit e.V. (Centre for Social and Ecological Sustainability, Permaculture and Connection to Nature), located on the grounds of the Coolmühle community project in Kuhlmühle. The centre functions as a learning site for sustainable technology and related educational activities. It has run the Hand Mill Museum since approximately 2014.

== Collection ==
The museum's collection originated as a private assortment of hand-operated mills and has grown over time. It comprises several hundred exhibits representing manually driven milling and processing devices used historically in domestic settings and gastronomy. The exhibits illustrate a variety of mechanical applications, such as pressing, grinding, and processing materials using human muscle power, demonstrating alternatives to fossil fuel or electric-powered machinery.

== Cultural and educational Role ==
The Hand Mill Museum is presented as a way to engage visitors with sustainable technologies and the possibilities of muscle-powered devices. It encourages reflection on technological development, sustainability, and the potential for post-fossil fuel practices.

== Location ==
The museum is located in the residential area of Kuhlmühle, near the former mill site at the outflow of the Großer Baalsee, within the municipality of Wittstock/Dosse in Brandenburg.
