= Christian Friedrich von Kahlbutz =

German knight whose corpse is preserved (1651–1702)

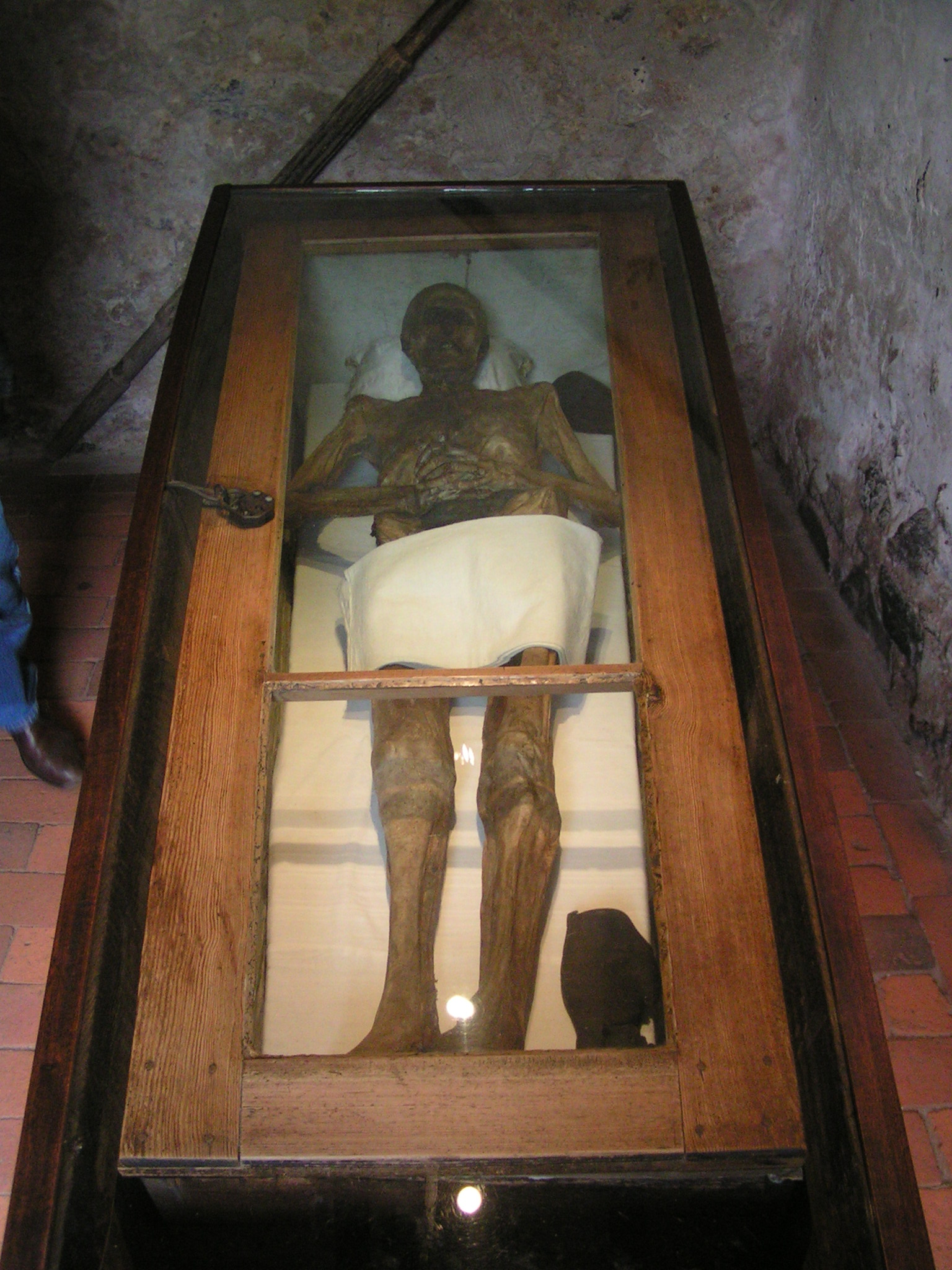
Complete view of the Kahlbutz mummy

Christian Friedrich von Kahlbutz (March 6, 1651 – November 3, 1702) was a German knight, who is most famous because of the state of preservation of his body; no noticeable mummification process was used upon his death. Today the preserved corpse is a tourist attraction.

== Background ==
Kahlbutz was born in Kampehl, Brandenburg. He was married to Margarete von Rohr for twelve years and had eleven children with her. He is also supposed to have had more than 30 illegitimate children. Kahlbutz was reportedly 1.70 metres tall and weighed approximately 70 kilograms during his life; the mummy's present weight is a mere 10 kilograms.

As a 24-year-old cornet, he was injured in his left knee in the Battle of Fehrbellin (1675) against the Swedes. The scar left by the wound is reportedly still visible as a bright notch in the knee. Two cannonballs, one small German and one large Swedish, said to be from that battle, were reportedly found at the foot of his coffin.

== Legend ==
According to local legend, "Knight Kalebuz," as he was known, frequently exercised the right of droit du seigneur. He had eleven children of his own and at least thirty other illegitimate children. In July 1690, he chose the bride of a shepherd named Pickert from the neighbouring village of Bückwitz. She refused him, and Kahlbutz subsequently murdered the shepherd in a meadow of his estate near the village of Schwenzebrücke. Although there were no witnesses, the shepherd's bride, Maria Leppin (who served on Kahlbutz's estate), publicly accused Kahlbutz of the murder and took him to court in Dreetz (Brandenburg). As an aristocrat, he had special rights and could swear an oath of innocence before the court to free himself. Kahlbutz did this, reportedly adding, "If I was the murderer I would to God that my body should never rot when I am dead", and was immediately acquitted.

Kahlbutz died in Kampehl on November 3, 1702, aged 51 and was laid to rest in a double coffin (an inner coffin of fir and an outer one of oak boards) in the family tomb. The last male offspring of his family reportedly died completely impoverished as a colonel in the town of Neuruppin north of Berlin in 1783.

In 1794, 92 years after Kahlbutz had died, the new owner of his estate, Equerry Krell, had the church in Kampehl redecorated. During this renovation, the coffins in the church, including three from the Kahlbutz family crypt (Kahlbutz's and two others containing completely decayed bodies of his family members), were to be buried in the cemetery. When the coffins were opened, it was discovered that all of the corpses except that of Knight Kahlbutz had decayed. A look at the parish registry revealed the mummy was that of Kahlbutz.

The local populace quickly found an explanation for the mummy of Knight Kahlbutz. They said that it was God's punishment for the murder of the shepherd, recalling the oath Kahlbutz had sworn.

=== Later Incidents ===
During the Napoleonic Wars, French soldiers were billeted in the village in 1806. One of them allegedly put the mummy out into the street to serve as a mock armed guard, accidentally putting a hole in the mummy's right thigh with his finger in the process.

In 1865, university students from Leipzig reportedly stole the mummy's boots, breast armour, and helmet. They later sent these items back, claiming to have drunk beer from the boots, which had caused great merriment.

At a wedding in Kampehl in 1913, one of the guests reportedly brought the mummy up from the crypt and put it into the bridal bed as a prank.

During the 1936 Berlin Olympics, many foreigners visited, including rich Americans and Japanese. The Americans allegedly offered to buy the mummy for $250,000, and the Japanese offered 100,000 German Reichsmarks.

== Natural mummification ==
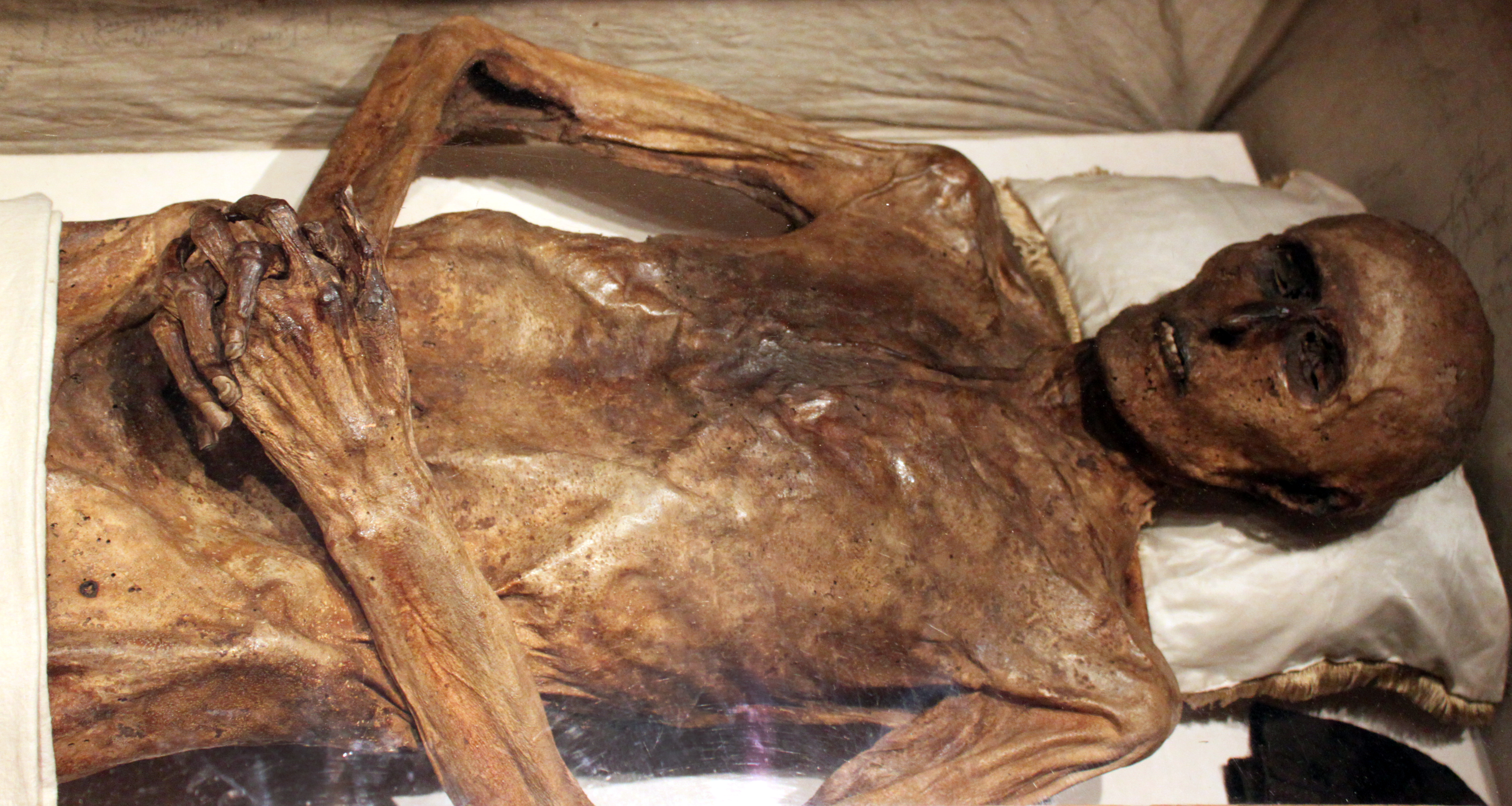
Mummy of Christian Friedrich von Kahlbutz

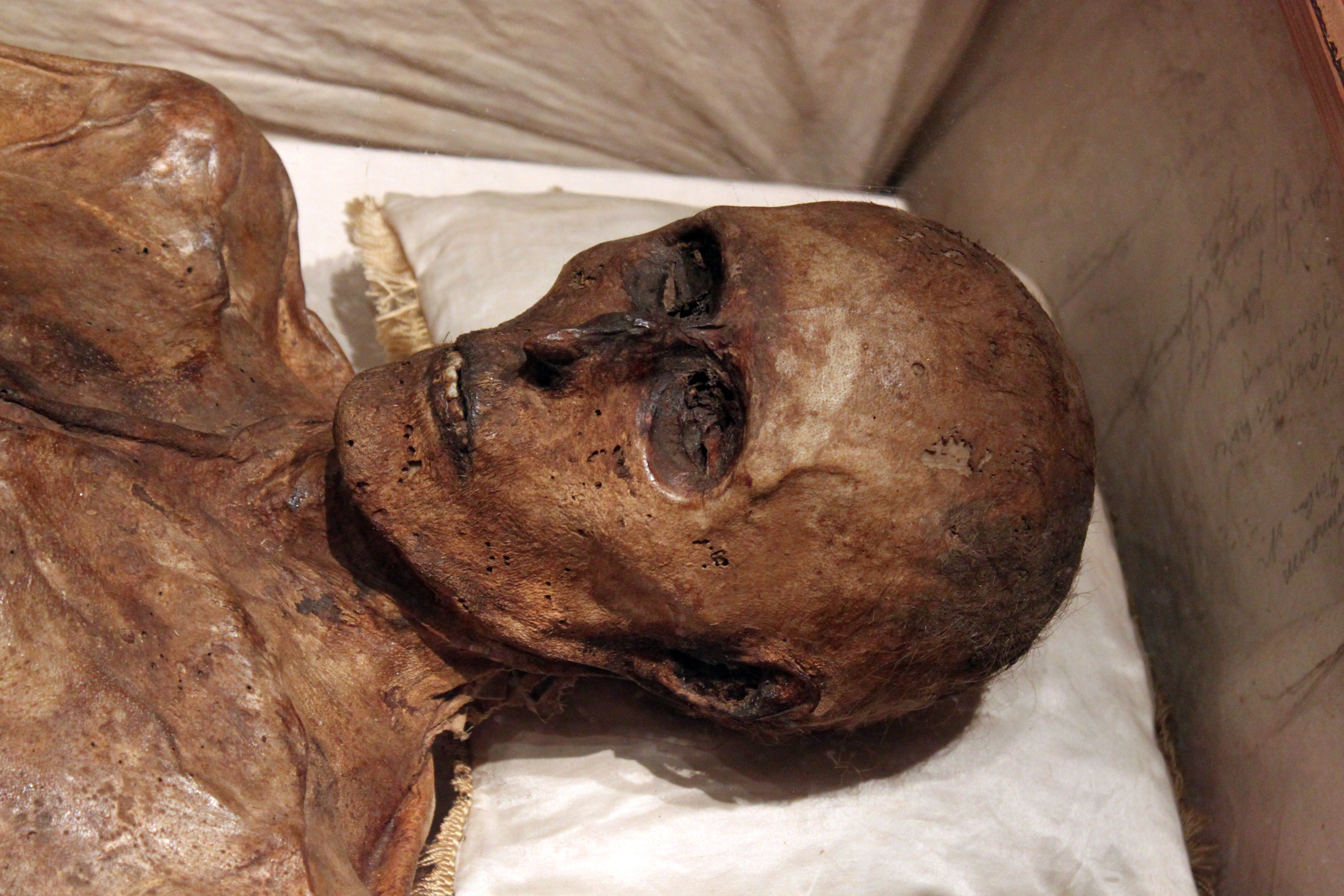
Christian Friedrich von Kahlbutz, detail

Several tests have been done on the mummy of the knight to figure out why a body that apparently was not embalmed has not undergone the natural decay process. In 1895, well-known pathologist and anthropologist Professor Rudolf Virchow examined the mummy, putting a hole in the side of its breast. He found that all organs were fully preserved, although they had dried up, and took a liver sample to see whether Kahlbutz had taken arsenic or some other poison that could have led to mummification, but did not detect anything of the kind. Professor Ferdinand Sauerbruch and Berlin forensic scientist Professor Strauch, who examined the mummy in 1930, also did not detect any such chemicals. Charité, the largest university hospital in Europe, also conducted tests. Although these scientists were divided on the causes of the mummification, they agreed the body had not been embalmed. It remains a mystery as to why Kahlbutz's corpse has not decayed, but there are a few other similar cases where the natural decay process has not affected the individual.

A university professor from Hamburg examined the crypt in 1940 for its lead, radium, and saltpetre content but found nothing. This was not surprising, as if those substances had been present, the other two corpses in the Kahlbutz crypt would likely not have decomposed either.

The natural decay process of a corpse can be stopped or retarded under certain circumstances, in which the corpse becomes leathery. Air conditions surrounding the body as well as the condition of the ground in which it is buried are most often contributing factors. Absolute dryness, local radioactivity, or other ground factors such as acidity or salts. Also hermetically sealed coffins without steadily moving air can contribute. Likewise, a small ingestion of poisonous medicines, i.e. very small quantities innocuous to an individual, during one's lifetime can aid in the mummification process after death. These kinds of substances are not readily detectable long after death though since the fat and water in the corpse changes and evaporates over time.

Today it is accepted that Kahlbutz suffered from some kind of illness, which caused an emaciation of his body. Possible diseases that he suffered from are cancer, muscular dystrophy, and tuberculosis. There is evidence that he did in fact suffer from the latter. According to several sources, Kahlbutz suffocated on his own blood, which suggests that shortly before his death he lost a great deal of blood. After his death he was buried in an oak double coffin. Bodily decay may have been prevented by the fact that prior to being hermetically sealed in the coffin, he had lost a great deal of blood, in combination with the lack of soil containing decay-accelerating materials. The body was reportedly found lying on wood shavings put there when it was placed in the coffin in 1702.

The mummy still has some hair left on its head and face, and its teeth, fingernails, and toenails are also well-preserved.

=== Associated Artifacts ===
Next to the mummy's head, the velvet cap it was wearing when found is displayed. Next to its left leg lies a shroud, now yellow with age. The original double coffin is still used: the inside coffin of fir has a flat lid, which was inset with glass after 1794 (it used to be open for visitors, some of whom inscribed their names inside); the external coffin is made of oak boards. The lid of the oak coffin, decorated with Bible quotations and Latin initials, is displayed in a corner of the room. Next to it is Kahlbutz's spear, thought to have been used as a flagstaff due to its perforated tip and nails driven into it to serve as eyelets. Remnants of medal ribbons in picture frames, discovered in the matting of the coffin by a restorer in 1960, are also displayed. Old photos of the Kahlbutz family manor house (which now houses a home for children from broken families) and two shields (discovered in the castle garret, likely for decoration as they lack handles) are also in the crypt.

== See also ==
- Incorruptibility, a property of the bodies of certain saints which, though not mummified, have not decayed
