= Rüthnick =

- Municipality
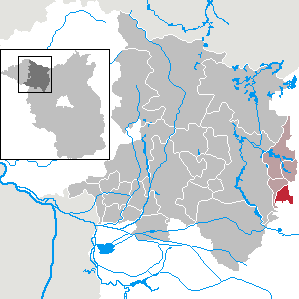
- Location of Rüthnick within Ostprignitz-Ruppin district
- Interactive map of Rüthnick
- Location within Germany Location within Brandenburg
- Coordinates: 52°53′N 12°59′E
- Country: Germany
- State: Brandenburg
- District: Ostprignitz-Ruppin
- Municipal assoc.: Lindow (Mark)

Government
  - Mayor (2024–29): Birgit Salzwedel

Area
  - Total: 17.66 km^{2} (6.82 sq mi)
- Elevation: 40 m (130 ft)

Population (2025-12-31)
  - Total: 454
  - Density: 25.7/km^{2} (66.6/sq mi)
- Time zone: UTC+01:00 (CET)
  - Summer (DST): UTC+02:00 (CEST)
- Postal codes: 16835
- Dialling codes: 033926
- Vehicle registration: OPR

Rüthnick is a municipality in the Ostprignitz-Ruppin district, in Brandenburg, Germany.

== Demography ==
Development of population since 1875 within the current boundaries (Blue line: Population; Dotted line: Comparison to population development of Brandenburg state; Grey background: Time of Nazi rule; Red background: Time of communist rule)

Rüthnick: Population development
within the current boundaries (2013)

Year	Pop.	±% p.a.
1875	472	—
1890	436	−0.53%
1910	420	−0.19%
1925	451	+0.48%
1933	497	+1.22%
1939	515	+0.59%
1946	902	+8.34%
1950	767	−3.97%
1964	550	−2.35%
1971	486	−1.75%
1981	415	−1.57%
1985	419	+0.24%
1989	393	−1.59%
1990	375	−4.58%
1991	372	−0.80%
1992	365	−1.88%
1993	377	+3.29%
1994	435	+15.38%
1995	467	+7.36%
1996	487	+4.28%

Year	Pop.	±% p.a.
1997	471	−3.29%
1998	490	+4.03%
1999	506	+3.27%
2000	495	−2.17%
2001	507	+2.42%
2002	516	+1.78%
2003	526	+1.94%
2004	518	−1.52%
2005	508	−1.93%
2006	491	−3.35%
2007	486	−1.02%
2008	485	−0.21%
2009	499	+2.89%
2010	497	−0.40%
2011	494	−0.60%
2012	495	+0.20%
2013	488	−1.41%
2014	472	−3.28%
2015	479	+1.48%
2016	489	+2.09%
