= Vielitzsee =

- Municipality
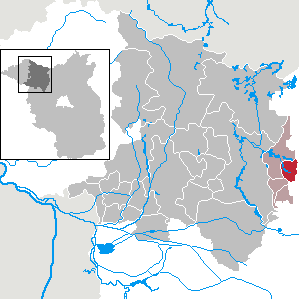
- Location of Vielitzsee within Ostprignitz-Ruppin district
- Interactive map of Vielitzsee
- Location within Germany Location within Brandenburg
- Coordinates: 52°56′25″N 13°01′23″E
- Country: Germany
- State: Brandenburg
- District: Ostprignitz-Ruppin
- Municipal assoc.: Lindow (Mark)

Government
  - Mayor (2024–29): Fereno Zitzmann

Area
  - Total: 22.82 km^{2} (8.81 sq mi)
- Elevation: 50 m (160 ft)

Population (2025-12-31)
  - Total: 463
  - Density: 20.3/km^{2} (52.5/sq mi)
- Time zone: UTC+01:00 (CET)
  - Summer (DST): UTC+02:00 (CEST)
- Postal codes: 16835
- Dialling codes: 033933
- Vehicle registration: OPR
- Website: www.amt-lindow-mark.de

Vielitzsee is a municipality in the Ostprignitz-Ruppin district, in Brandenburg, Germany.

Churches

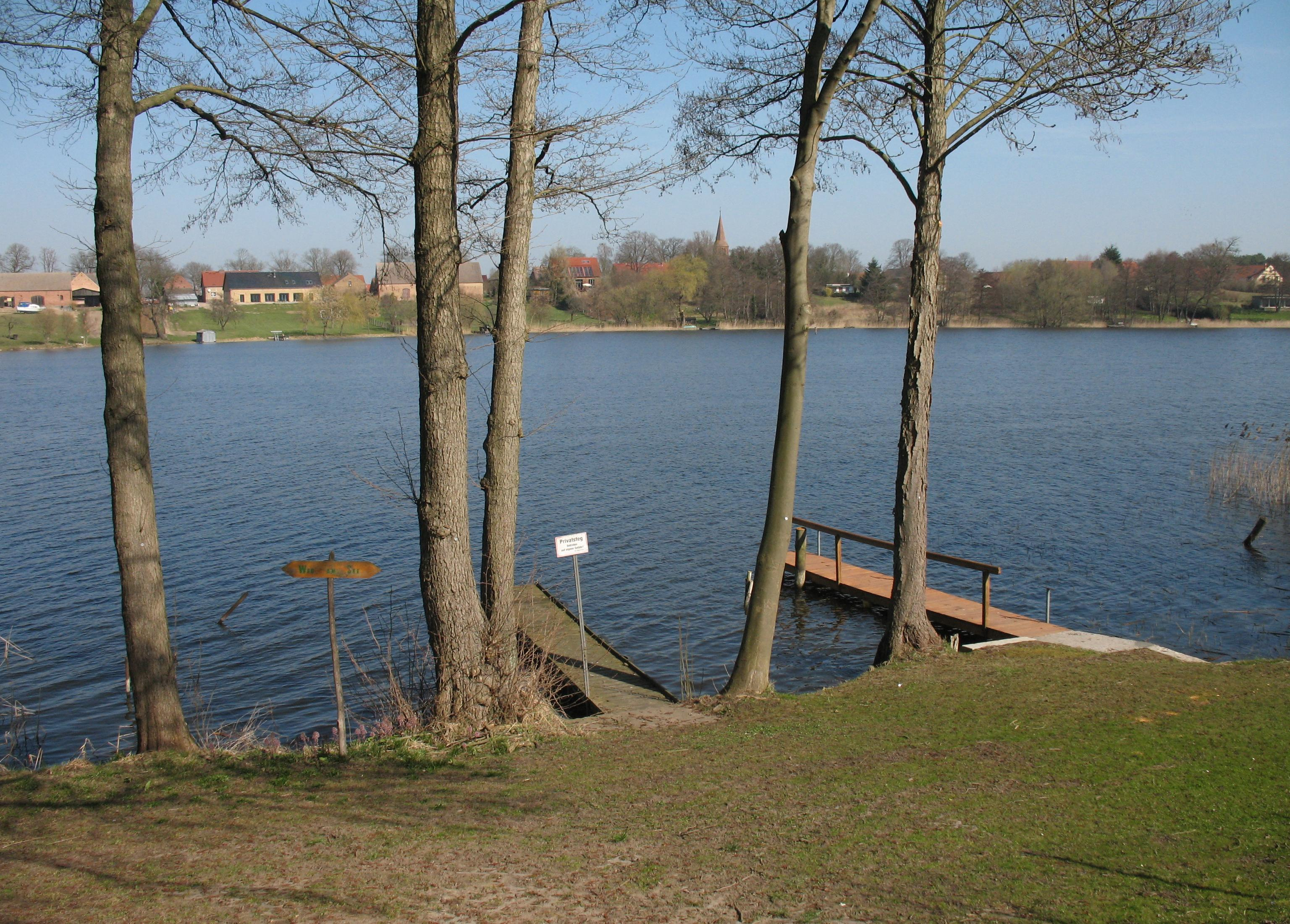
Lake Vielitz

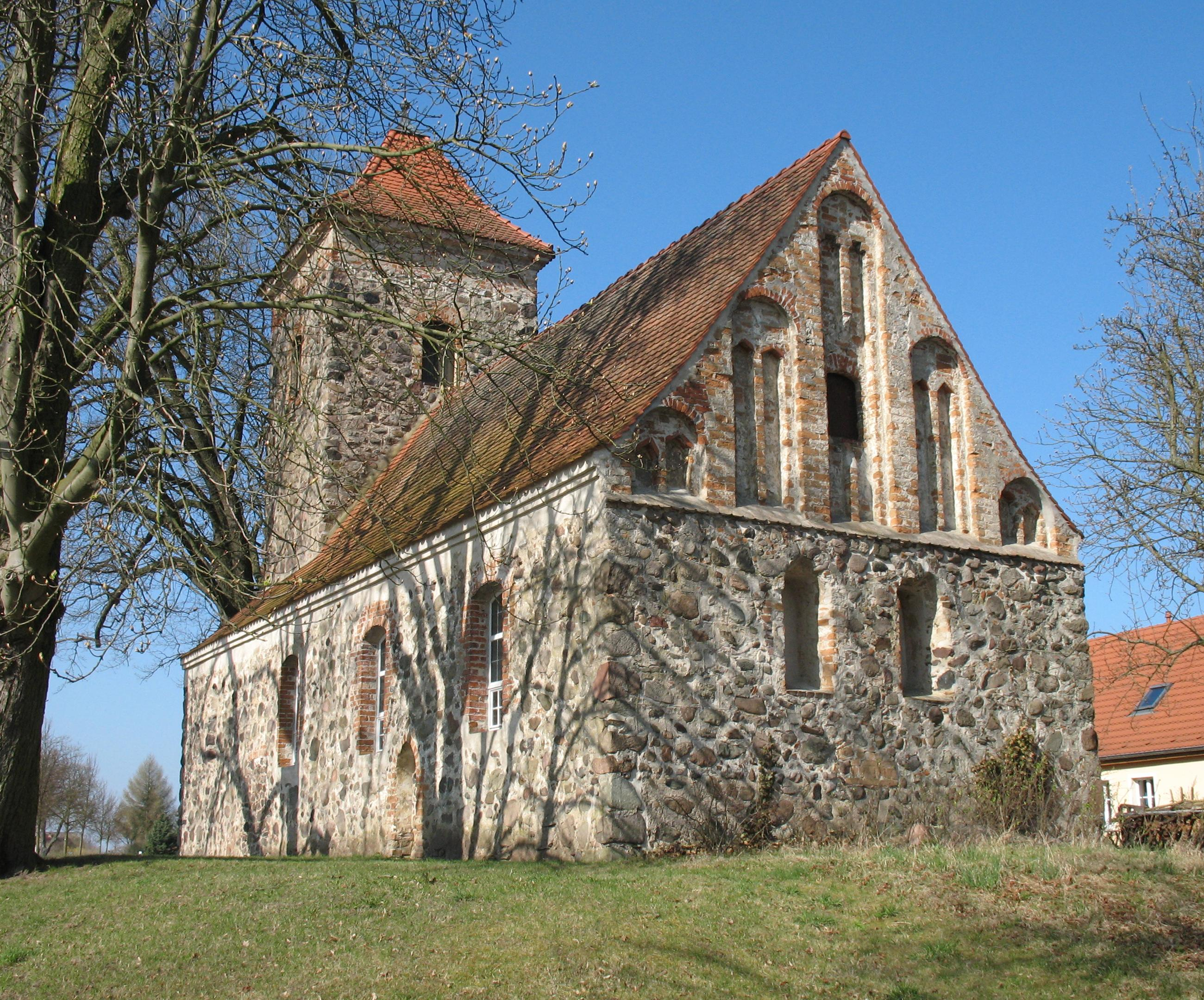
Vielitz

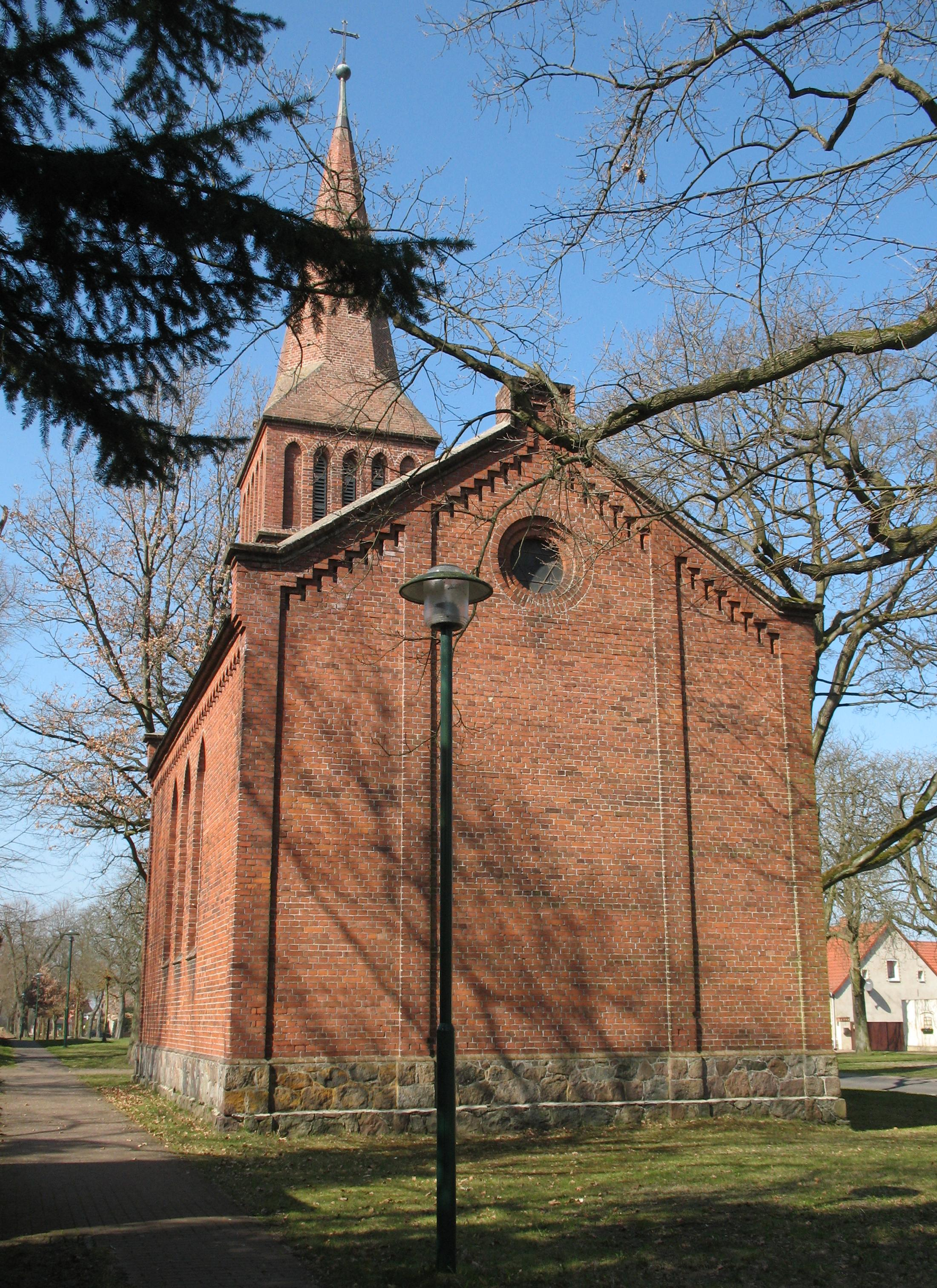
Seebeck

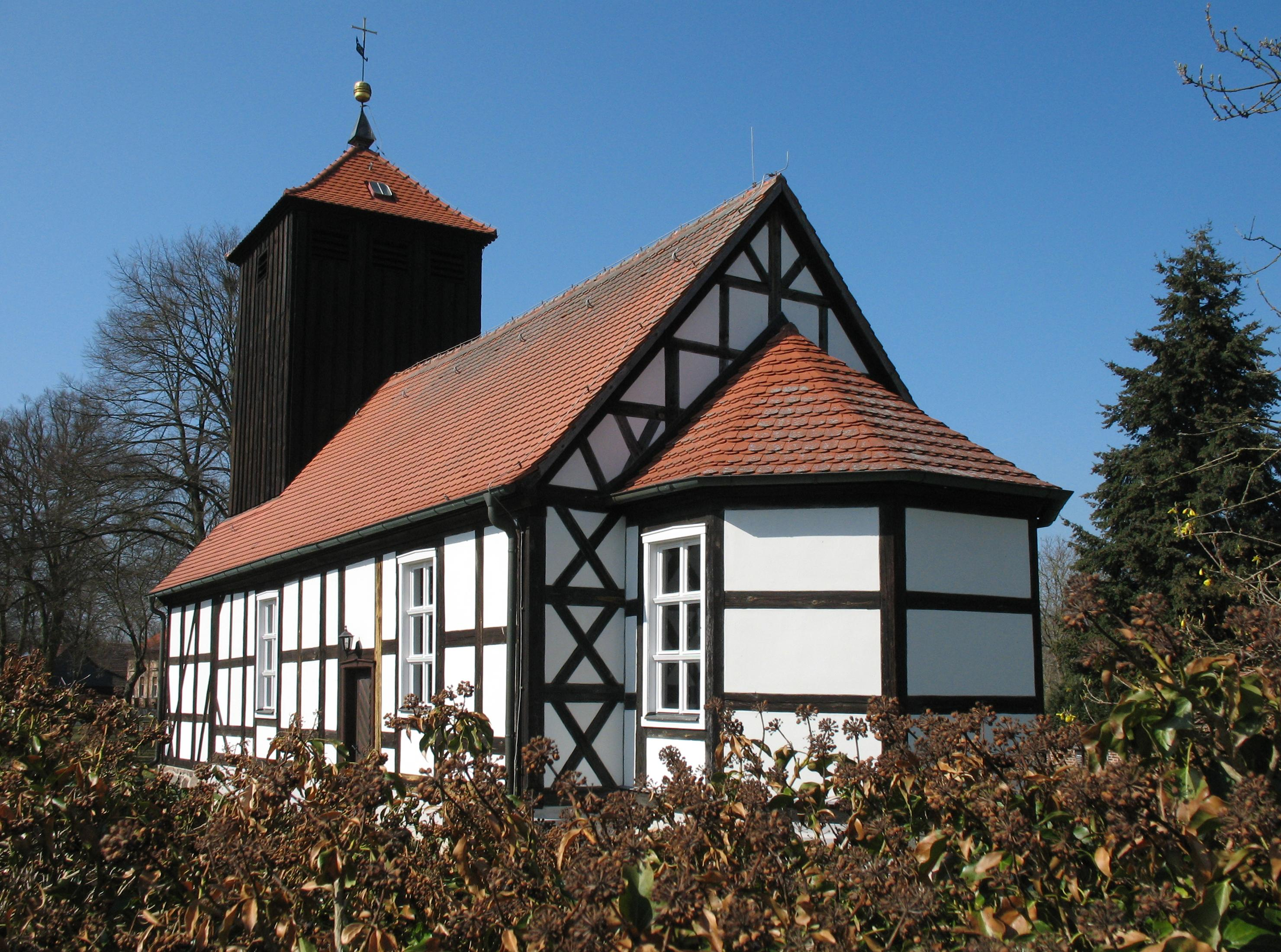
Strubensee

== Demography ==
Development of population since 1875 within the current boundaries (Blue line: Population; Dotted line: Comparison to population development of Brandenburg state; Grey background: Time of Nazi rule; Red background: Time of communist rule)

Vielitzsee: Population development
within the current boundaries (2013)

Year	Pop.	±% p.a.
1875	528	—
1890	540	+0.15%
1910	547	+0.06%
1925	584	+0.44%
1933	563	−0.46%
1939	573	+0.29%
1946	1,015	+8.51%
1950	1,011	−0.10%
1964	617	−3.47%
1971	608	−0.21%
1981	520	−1.55%
1985	476	−2.19%
1989	474	−0.11%
1990	476	+0.42%
1991	479	+0.63%
1992	488	+1.88%
1993	521	+6.76%
1994	536	+2.88%
1995	545	+1.68%
1996	558	+2.39%

Year	Pop.	±% p.a.
1997	586	+5.02%
1998	570	−2.73%
1999	562	−1.40%
2000	553	−1.60%
2001	532	−3.80%
2002	529	−0.56%
2003	545	+3.02%
2004	551	+1.10%
2005	567	+2.90%
2006	540	−4.76%
2007	545	+0.93%
2008	552	+1.28%
2009	544	−1.45%
2010	546	+0.37%
2011	479	−12.27%
2012	467	−2.51%
2013	456	−2.36%
2014	473	+3.73%
2015	463	−2.11%
2016	458	−1.08%
