= Sieversdorf-Hohenofen =

- Municipality
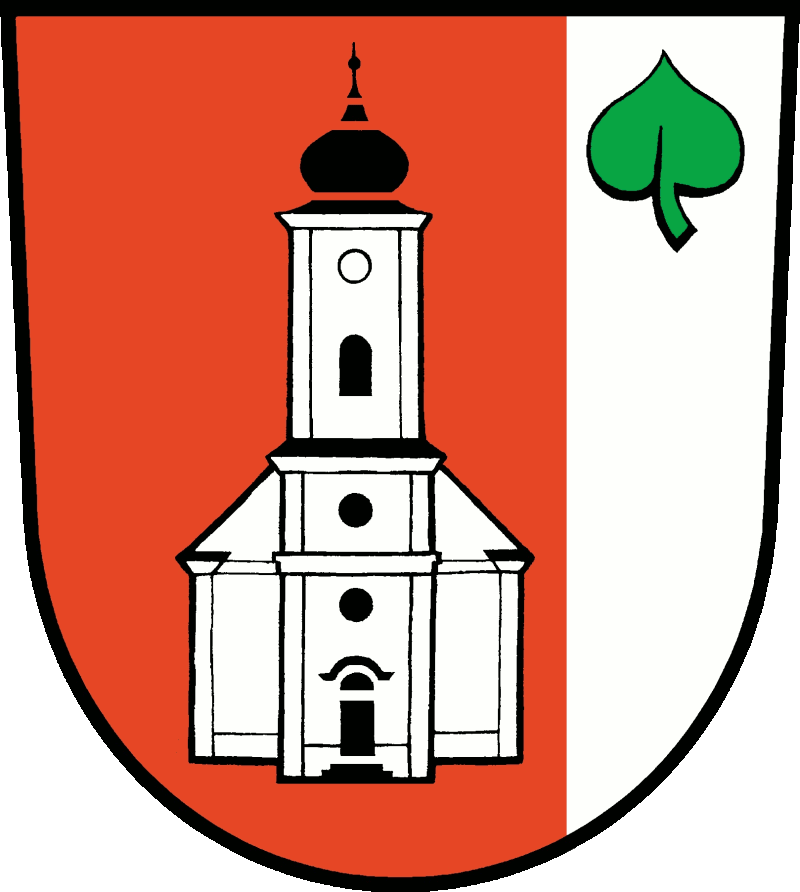
- Coat of arms

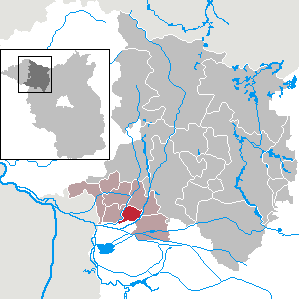
- Location of Sieversdorf-Hohenofen within Ostprignitz-Ruppin district
- Interactive map of Sieversdorf-Hohenofen
- Location within Germany Location within Brandenburg
- Coordinates: 52°49′30″N 12°24′17″E
- Country: Germany
- State: Brandenburg
- District: Ostprignitz-Ruppin
- Municipal assoc.: Neustadt (Dosse)
- Subdivisions: 2 Ortsteile

Government
  - Mayor (2024–29): Thomas Leitert

Area
  - Total: 19.83 km^{2} (7.66 sq mi)
- Elevation: 28 m (92 ft)

Population (2025-12-31)
  - Total: 664
  - Density: 33.5/km^{2} (86.7/sq mi)
- Time zone: UTC+01:00 (CET)
  - Summer (DST): UTC+02:00 (CEST)
- Postal codes: 16845
- Dialling codes: 033970
- Vehicle registration: OPR
- Website: www.sieversdorf-hohenofen.de

Sieversdorf-Hohenofen is a municipality in the Ostprignitz-Ruppin district, in Brandenburg, Germany.

== Demography ==
Development of population since 1875 within the current boundaries (Blue line: Population; Dotted line: Comparison to population development of Brandenburg state; Grey background: Time of Nazi rule; Red background: Time of communist rule)

Sieversdorf-Hohenofen: Population development
within the current boundaries (2013)

| Year | Pop. | ±% p.a. |
|---|---|---|
| 1875 | 2,070 | — |
| 1890 | 1,899 | −0.57% |
| 1910 | 1,589 | −0.89% |
| 1925 | 1,542 | −0.20% |
| 1933 | 1,468 | −0.61% |
| 1939 | 1,433 | −0.40% |
| 1946 | 2,043 | +5.20% |
| 1950 | 2,037 | −0.07% |
| 1964 | 1,427 | −2.51% |
| 1971 | 1,335 | −0.95% |
| 1981 | 1,129 | −1.66% |
| 1985 | 1,086 | −0.97% |
| 1989 | 1,052 | −0.79% |
| 1990 | 1,030 | −2.09% |
| 1991 | 993 | −3.59% |
| 1992 | 968 | −2.52% |
| 1993 | 947 | −2.17% |
| 1994 | 935 | −1.27% |
| 1995 | 933 | −0.21% |
| 1996 | 1,001 | +7.29% |

| Year | Pop. | ±% p.a. |
|---|---|---|
| 1997 | 928 | −7.29% |
| 1998 | 915 | −1.40% |
| 1999 | 921 | +0.66% |
| 2000 | 903 | −1.95% |
| 2001 | 894 | −1.00% |
| 2002 | 908 | +1.57% |
| 2003 | 896 | −1.32% |
| 2004 | 891 | −0.56% |
| 2005 | 869 | −2.47% |
| 2006 | 843 | −2.99% |
| 2007 | 856 | +1.54% |
| 2008 | 846 | −1.17% |
| 2009 | 821 | −2.96% |
| 2010 | 813 | −0.97% |
| 2011 | 756 | −7.01% |
| 2012 | 742 | −1.85% |
| 2013 | 718 | −3.23% |
| 2014 | 708 | −1.39% |
| 2015 | 706 | −0.28% |
| 2016 | 715 | +1.27% |
