= Herzberg, Ostprignitz-Ruppin =

Herzberg
- Municipality
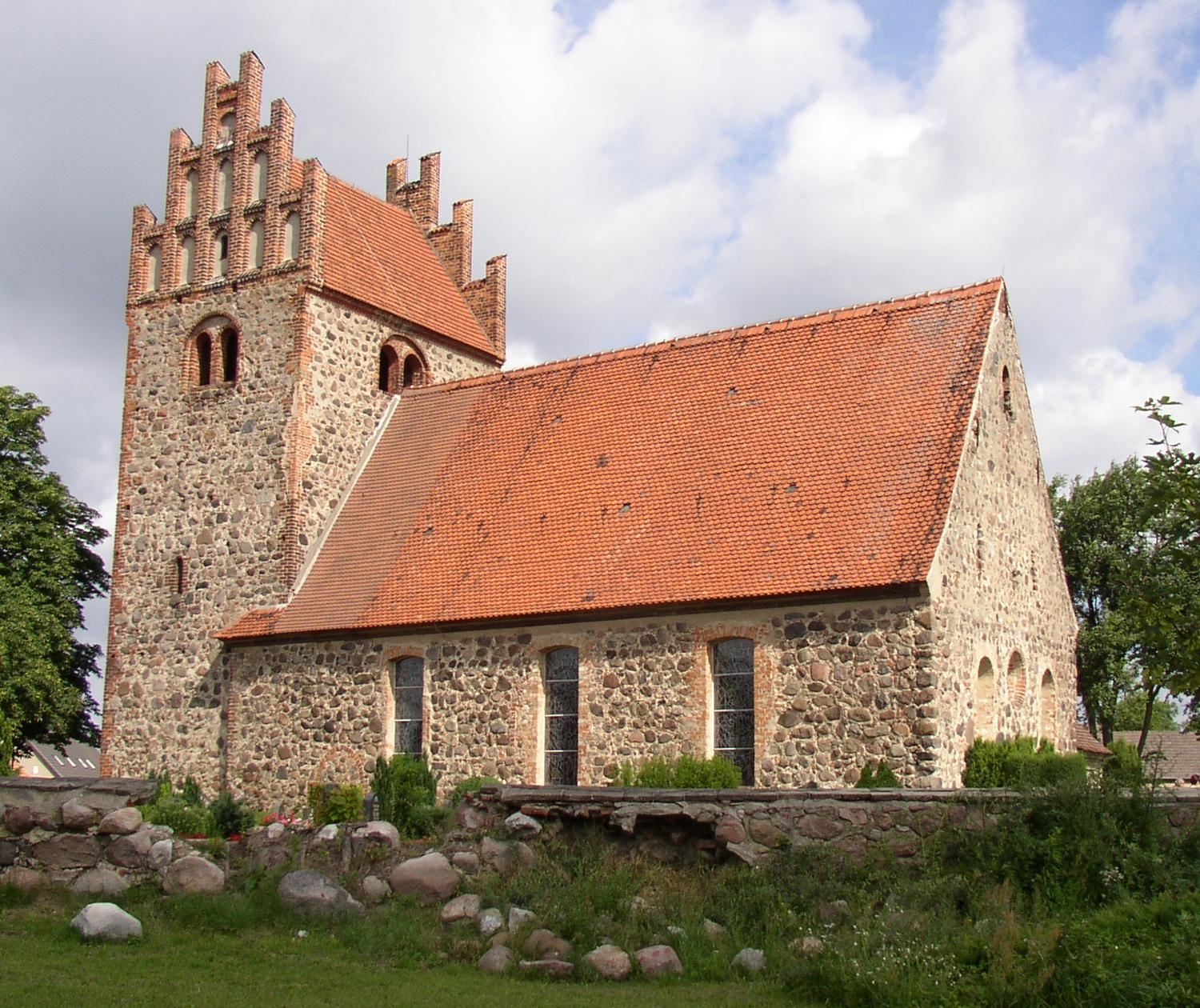
- Church

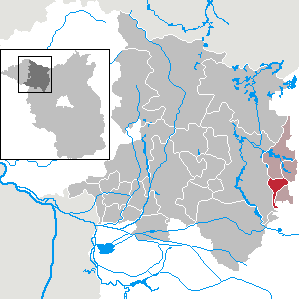
- Location of Herzberg within Ostprignitz-Ruppin district
- Interactive map of Herzberg
- Location within Germany Location within Brandenburg
- Coordinates: 52°54′N 12°59′E
- Country: Germany
- State: Brandenburg
- District: Ostprignitz-Ruppin
- Municipal assoc.: Lindow (Mark)

Government
  - Mayor (2024–29): Michaela Wolff

Area
  - Total: 18.72 km^{2} (7.23 sq mi)
- Elevation: 46 m (151 ft)

Population (2025-12-31)
  - Total: 650
  - Density: 35/km^{2} (90/sq mi)
- Time zone: UTC+01:00 (CET)
  - Summer (DST): UTC+02:00 (CEST)
- Postal codes: 16835
- Dialling codes: 033926
- Vehicle registration: OPR

Herzberg (German pronunciation: [ˈhɛʁtsˌbɛʁk]) is a municipality in the Ostprignitz-Ruppin district, in Brandenburg, Germany.

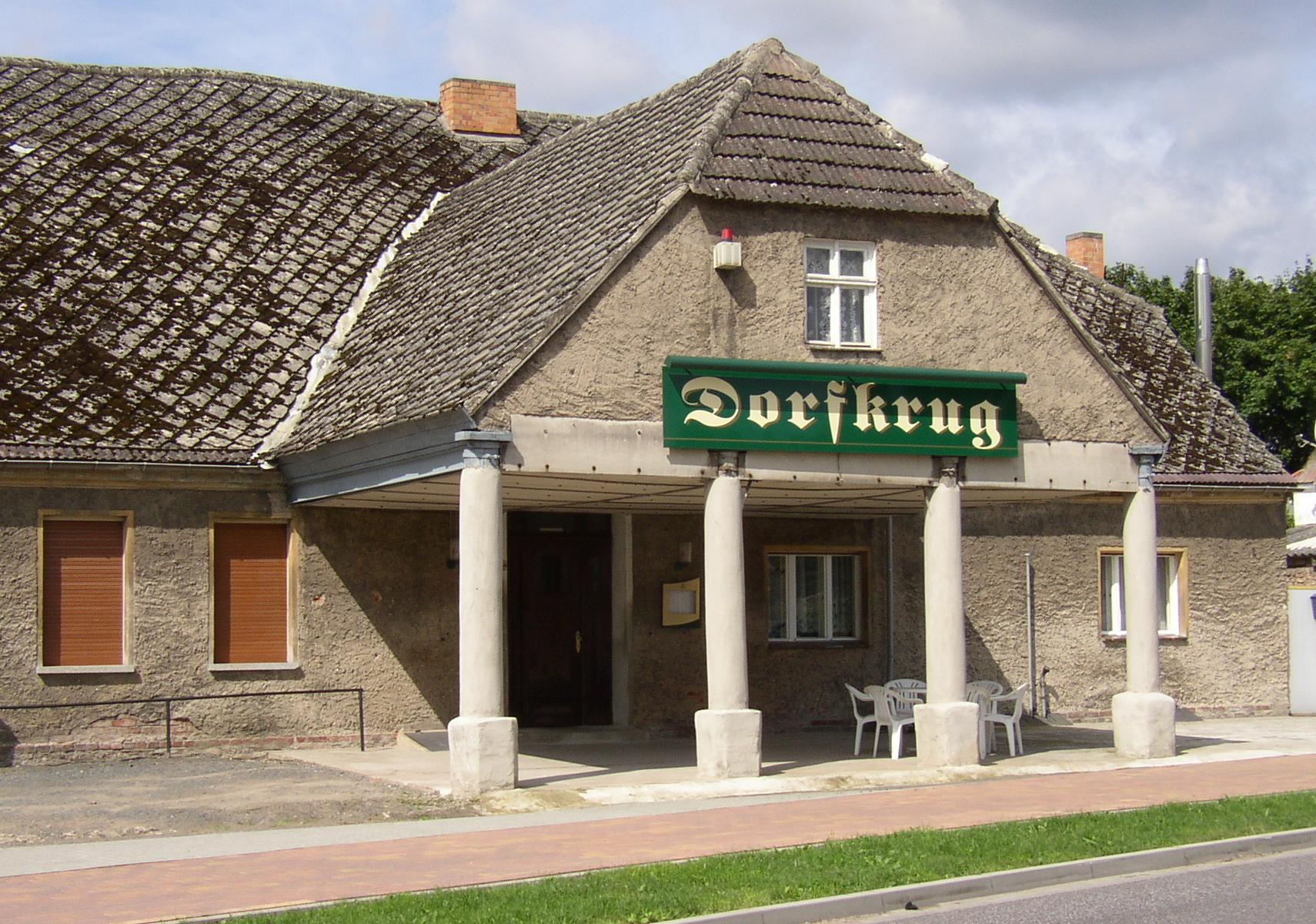
Alcove house

== History ==
From 1815 to 1945, Herzberg was part of the Prussian Province of Brandenburg. From 1952 to 1990, it was part of the Bezirk Potsdam of East Germany.

== Demography ==
Development of population since 1875 within the current boundaries (Blue line: Population; Dotted line: Comparison to population development of Brandenburg state; Grey background: Time of Nazi rule; Red background: Time of communist rule)

Herzberg (Mark): Population development
within the current boundaries (2013)

Year	Pop.	±% p.a.
1875	869	—
1890	795	−0.59%
1910	768	−0.17%
1925	728	−0.36%
1933	767	+0.65%
1939	843	+1.59%
1946	1,275	+6.09%
1950	1,266	−0.18%
1964	874	−2.61%
1971	855	−0.31%
1981	738	−1.46%
1985	729	−0.31%
1989	716	−0.45%
1990	700	−2.23%
1991	668	−4.57%
1992	673	+0.75%
1993	659	−2.08%
1994	642	−2.58%
1995	643	+0.16%
1996	624	−2.95%

Year	Pop.	±% p.a.
1997	640	+2.56%
1998	681	+6.41%
1999	683	+0.29%
2000	699	+2.34%
2001	698	−0.14%
2002	716	+2.58%
2003	721	+0.70%
2004	703	−2.50%
2005	708	+0.71%
2006	667	−5.79%
2007	671	+0.60%
2008	669	−0.30%
2009	672	+0.45%
2010	660	−1.79%
2011	643	−2.58%
2012	634	−1.40%
2013	638	+0.63%
2014	617	−3.29%
2015	630	+2.11%
2016	659	+4.60%
