= Stüdenitz-Schönermark =

- Municipality
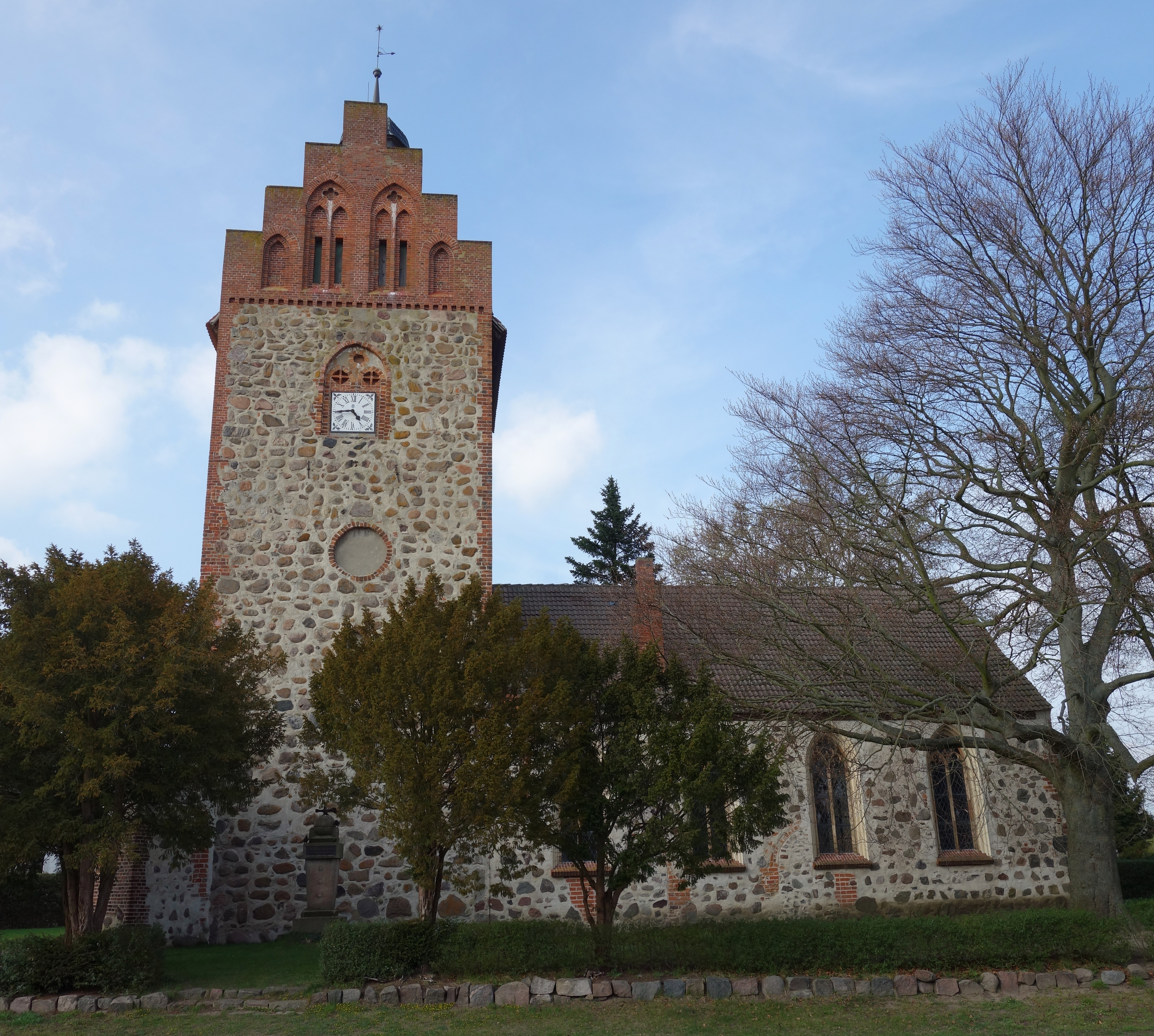
- Church in Schönermark

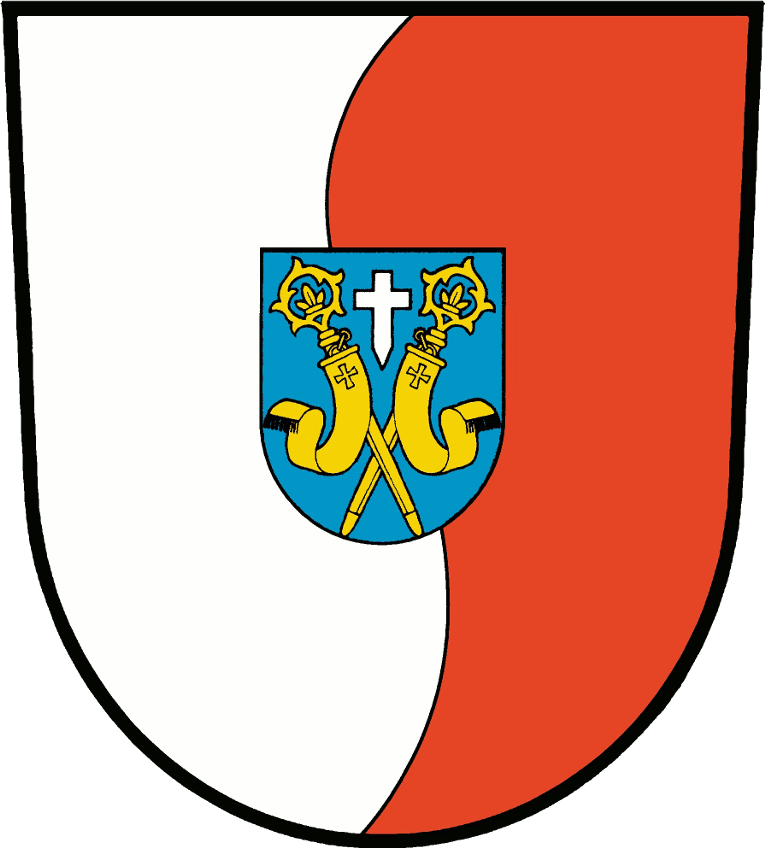
- Coat of arms

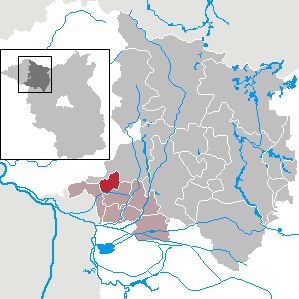
- Location of Stüdenitz-Schönermark within Ostprignitz-Ruppin district
- Interactive map of Stüdenitz-Schönermark
- Location within Germany Location within Brandenburg
- Coordinates: 52°53′45″N 12°18′15″E
- Country: Germany
- State: Brandenburg
- District: Ostprignitz-Ruppin
- Municipal assoc.: Neustadt (Dosse)

Government
  - Mayor (2024–29): Andreas Höger

Area
  - Total: 24.34 km^{2} (9.40 sq mi)
- Elevation: 40 m (130 ft)

Population (2025-12-31)
  - Total: 594
  - Density: 24.4/km^{2} (63.2/sq mi)
- Time zone: UTC+01:00 (CET)
  - Summer (DST): UTC+02:00 (CEST)
- Postal codes: 16845
- Dialling codes: 033972
- Vehicle registration: OPR
- Website: www.neustadt-dosse.de

Stüdenitz-Schönermark is a municipality in the Ostprignitz-Ruppin district, in Brandenburg, Germany.

== Demography ==
Development of population since 1875 within the current boundaries (Blue line: Population; Dotted line: Comparison to population development of Brandenburg state; Grey background: Time of Nazi rule; Red background: Time of communist rule)

Stüdenitz-Schönermark: Population development
within the current boundaries (2013)

Year	Pop.	±% p.a.
1875	984	—
1890	979	−0.03%
1910	955	−0.12%
1925	1,049	+0.63%
1933	1,019	−0.36%
1939	972	−0.78%
1946	1,524	+6.64%
1950	1,437	−1.46%
1964	1,128	−1.71%
1971	1,100	−0.36%
1981	917	−1.80%
1985	908	−0.25%
1989	888	−0.56%
1990	881	−0.79%
1991	865	−1.82%
1992	854	−1.27%
1993	844	−1.17%
1994	825	−2.25%
1995	809	−1.94%
1996	792	−2.10%

Year	Pop.	±% p.a.
1997	779	−1.64%
1998	766	−1.67%
1999	750	−2.09%
2000	738	−1.60%
2001	727	−1.49%
2002	732	+0.69%
2003	729	−0.41%
2004	708	−2.88%
2005	691	−2.40%
2006	680	−1.59%
2007	655	−3.68%
2008	641	−2.14%
2009	637	−0.62%
2010	618	−2.98%
2011	616	−0.32%
2012	617	+0.16%
2013	597	−3.24%
2014	583	−2.35%
2015	578	−0.86%
2016	579	+0.17%
