= Neustadt (Dosse) =

- Town
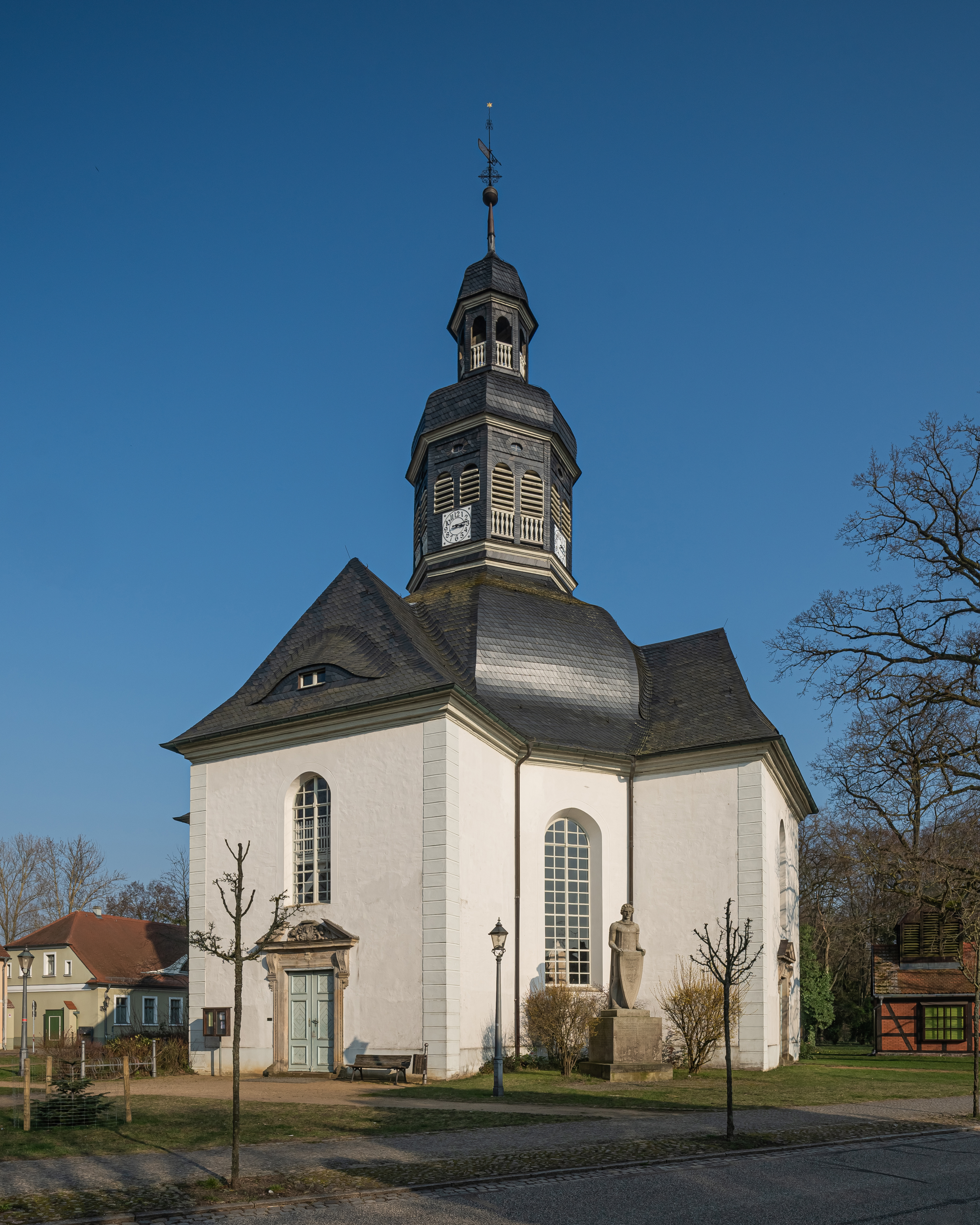
- Town church

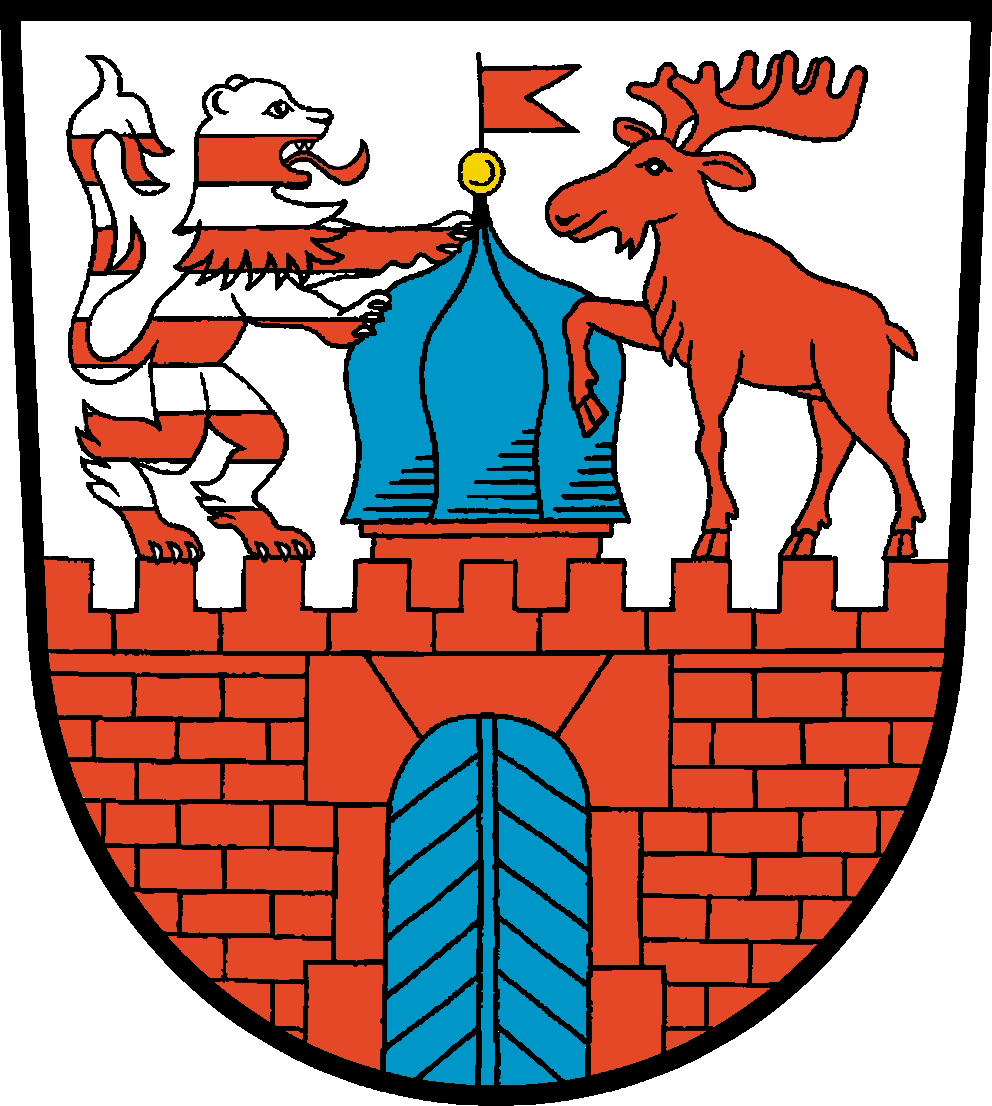
- Coat of arms

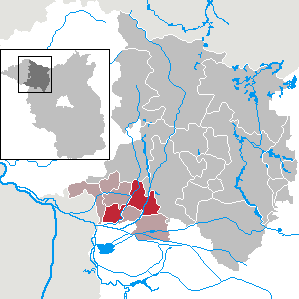
- Location of Neustadt within Ostprignitz-Ruppin district
- Interactive map of Neustadt
- Location within Germany Location within Brandenburg
- Coordinates: 52°52′00″N 12°25′59″E
- Country: Germany
- State: Brandenburg
- District: Ostprignitz-Ruppin
- Municipal assoc.: Neustadt (Dosse)

Government
  - Mayor (2024–29): André Stimm

Area
  - Total: 75.87 km^{2} (29.29 sq mi)
- Elevation: 35 m (115 ft)

Population (2025-12-31)
  - Total: 3,502
  - Density: 46.16/km^{2} (119.5/sq mi)
- Time zone: UTC+01:00 (CET)
  - Summer (DST): UTC+02:00 (CEST)
- Postal codes: 16845
- Dialling codes: 033970
- Vehicle registration: OPR
- Website: www.neustadt-dosse.de

Neustadt (Dosse) (German pronunciation: [ˈnɔʏʃtat]) is a town in the district of Ostprignitz-Ruppin, Brandenburg, Germany with a population of 3,575 (as of 2010). It has a total area of 75.43 km^{2}, and lies close to the river Dosse.

== History ==
Neustadt was founded in 1407 by the Count of Ruppin. In 1788, the Prussian king Friedrich William II expanded the town and his stud. Until today, the national stud of Brandenburg (Brandenburgisches Haupt- und Landgestüt, i.e. Brandenburgian Main and State Stud) is located in Neustadt which is thus a principal place of the horse breeding in Brandenburg, especially for horses of the Brandenburger breed.

From 1815 to 1945, Neustadt was part of the Prussian Province of Brandenburg. from 1952 to 1990, it was part of the Bezirk Potsdam of East Germany.

== Areas ==
Babe, Helenenhof, Kampehl, Köritz, Leddin, Lindenau, Neuhof, Neuroddahn, Plänitz, Schönfeld, Spiegelberg, and Strubbergshof.

== Demography ==
Development of population since 1875 within the current boundaries (Blue line: Population; Dotted line: Comparison to population development of Brandenburg state; Grey background: Time of Nazi rule; Red background: Time of communist rule)

Neustadt (Dosse): Population development
within the current boundaries (2013)

Year	Pop.	±% p.a.
1875	3,838	—
1890	3,768	−0.12%
1910	3,668	−0.13%
1925	4,138	+0.81%
1933	4,010	−0.39%
1939	3,873	−0.58%
1946	6,458	+7.58%
1950	6,231	−0.89%
1964	4,684	−2.02%
1971	4,486	−0.62%
1981	4,097	−0.90%
1985	3,972	−0.77%
1989	4,029	+0.36%
1990	3,946	−2.06%
1991	4,030	+2.13%
1992	4,088	+1.44%
1993	4,039	−1.20%
1994	3,963	−1.88%
1995	4,084	+3.05%
1996	4,042	−1.03%

Year	Pop.	±% p.a.
1997	4,112	+1.73%
1998	4,200	+2.14%
1999	4,151	−1.17%
2000	4,013	−3.32%
2001	4,044	+0.77%
2002	4,013	−0.77%
2003	4,004	−0.22%
2004	3,876	−3.20%
2005	3,781	−2.45%
2006	3,718	−1.67%
2007	3,691	−0.73%
2008	3,645	−1.25%
2009	3,622	−0.63%
2010	3,575	−1.30%
2011	3,531	−1.23%
2012	3,462	−1.95%
2013	3,403	−1.70%
2014	3,391	−0.35%
2015	3,435	+1.30%
2016	3,406	−0.84%

== Mayor ==
Sabine Ehrlich (SPD) was elected in May 2014 with 54,3 % of the votes for a term of five years.

== Sightseeing ==
The mummy of Christian Friedrich von Kahlbutz is located in Kampehl, which is a locality of Neustadt (Dosse).

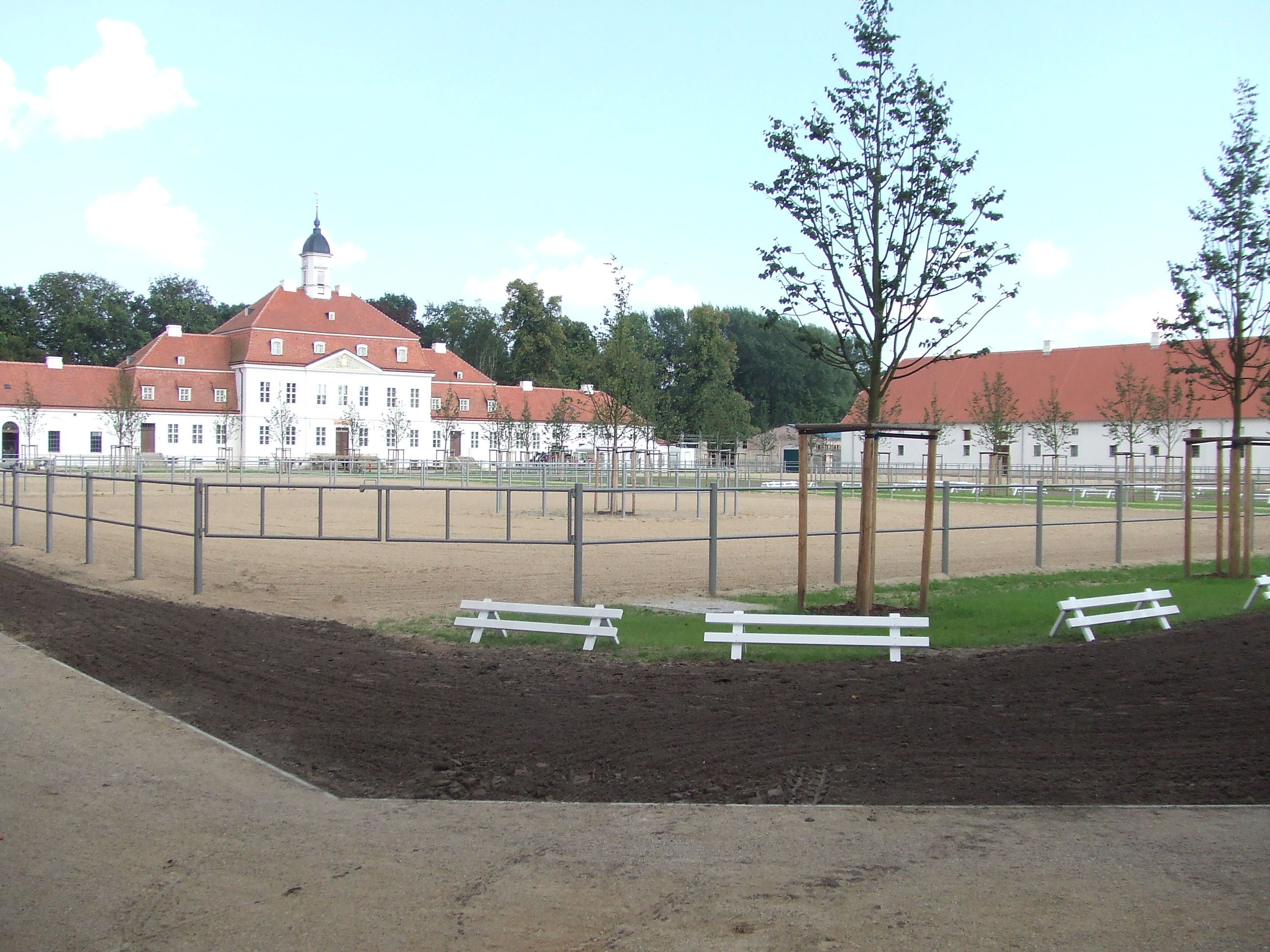
Stud Neustadt

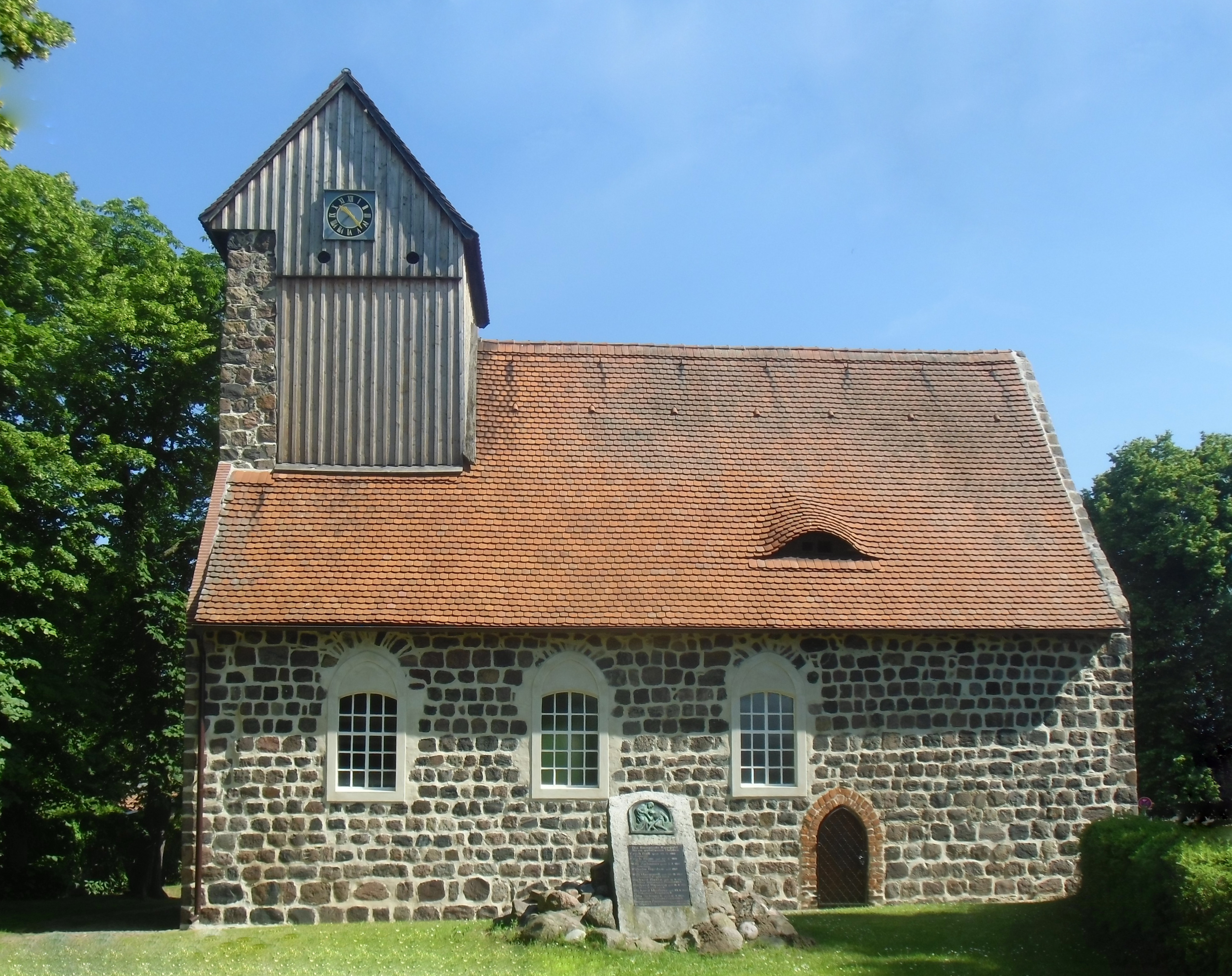
Church Kampehl

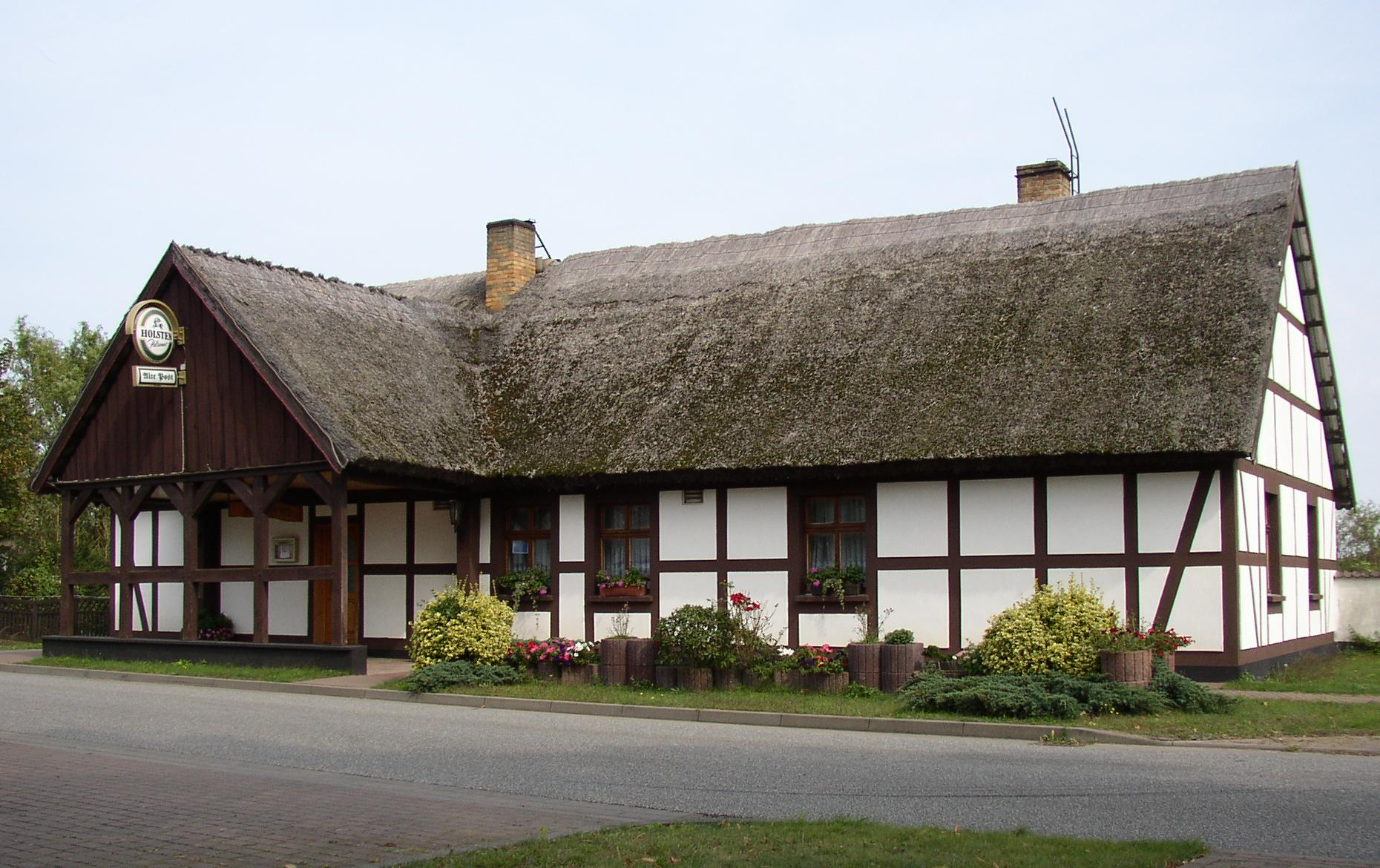
House in Plänitz

== Transportation ==
At Neustadt, there is a train stop of the regional express on the Berlin–Hamburg Railway.

== Sons and daughters of the town ==
- Ludwig Jonas (1797-1859), theologian
- August Lindemann (1842-1921), architect
- Paul Gustaf Krause (1867-1945), paleontologist
- Fritz Thörner (1869-1940), writer
