= Zernitz-Lohm =

- Municipality
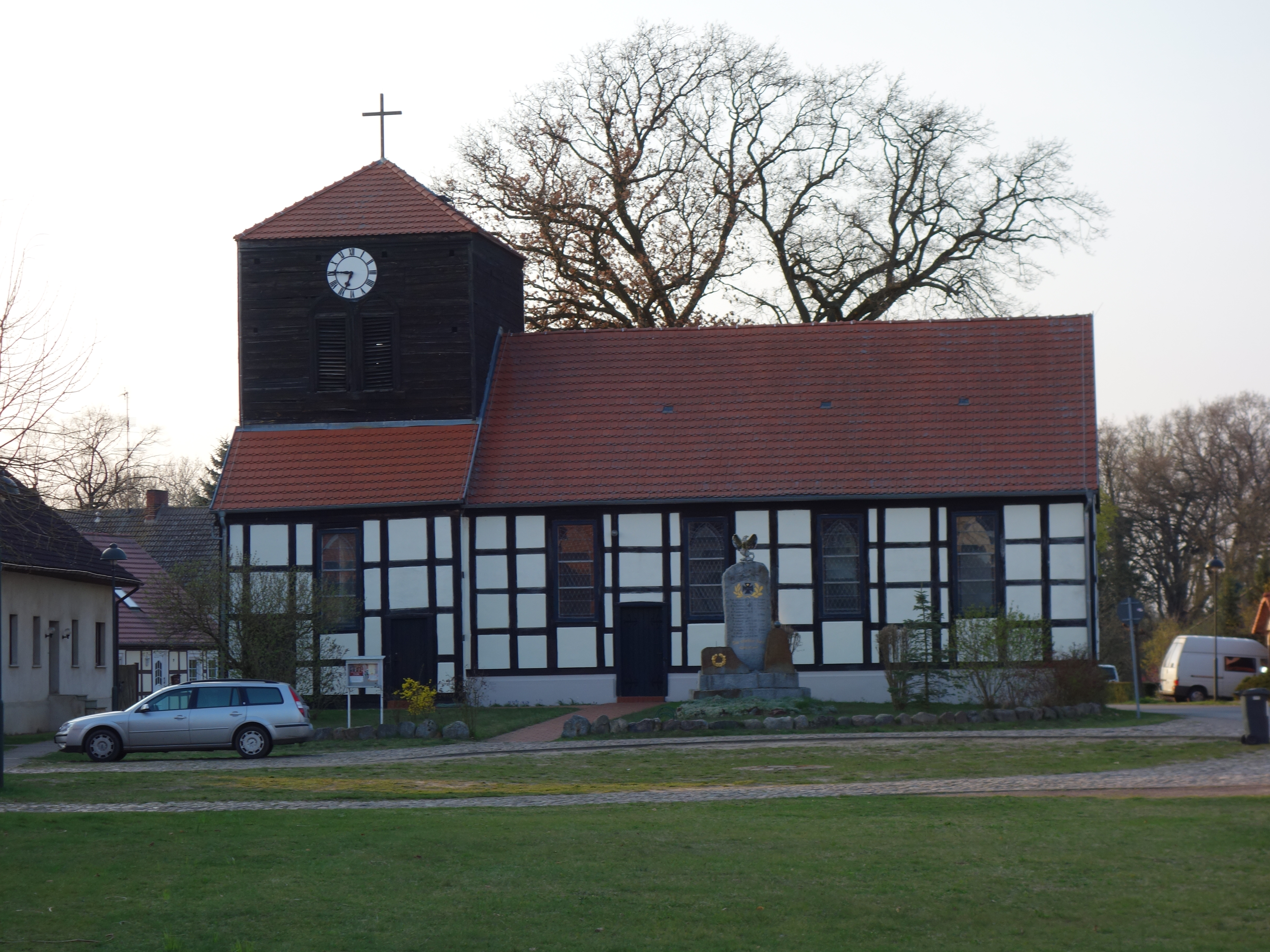
- Church in Lohm

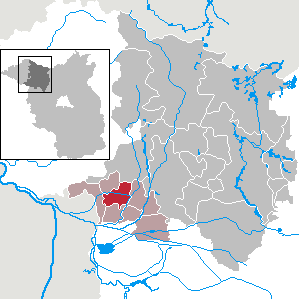
- Location of Zernitz-Lohm within Ostprignitz-Ruppin district
- Interactive map of Zernitz-Lohm
- Location within Germany Location within Brandenburg
- Coordinates: 52°52′30″N 12°20′30″E
- Country: Germany
- State: Brandenburg
- District: Ostprignitz-Ruppin
- Municipal assoc.: Neustadt (Dosse)

Government
  - Mayor (2024–29): Sigrid Schumacher (Greens)

Area
  - Total: 36.97 km^{2} (14.27 sq mi)
- Elevation: 33 m (108 ft)

Population (2025-12-31)
  - Total: 875
  - Density: 23.7/km^{2} (61.3/sq mi)
- Time zone: UTC+01:00 (CET)
  - Summer (DST): UTC+02:00 (CEST)
- Postal codes: 16845
- Dialling codes: 033973
- Vehicle registration: OPR
- Website: www.neustadt-dosse.de

Zernitz-Lohm is a municipality in the Ostprignitz-Ruppin district, in Brandenburg, Germany.

== Demography ==
Development of population since 1875 within the current boundaries (Blue line: Population; Dotted line: Comparison to population development of Brandenburg state; Grey background: Time of Nazi rule; Red background: Time of communist rule)

Zernitz-Lohm: Population development
within the current boundaries (2013)

Year	Pop.	±% p.a.
1875	1,099	—
1890	1,174	+0.44%
1910	1,043	−0.59%
1925	1,292	+1.44%
1933	1,209	−0.83%
1939	1,140	−0.97%
1946	1,994	+8.32%
1950	1,976	−0.23%
1964	1,483	−2.03%
1971	1,433	−0.49%
1981	1,252	−1.34%
1985	1,211	−0.83%
1989	1,159	−1.09%
1990	1,142	−1.47%
1991	1,108	−2.98%
1992	1,096	−1.08%
1993	1,098	+0.18%
1994	1,104	+0.55%
1995	1,087	−1.54%
1996	1,073	−1.29%

Year	Pop.	±% p.a.
1997	1,058	−1.40%
1998	1,047	−1.04%
1999	1,028	−1.81%
2000	1,027	−0.10%
2001	996	−3.02%
2002	985	−1.10%
2003	985	+0.00%
2004	981	−0.41%
2005	977	−0.41%
2006	976	−0.10%
2007	953	−2.36%
2008	943	−1.05%
2009	936	−0.74%
2010	916	−2.14%
2011	893	−2.51%
2012	866	−3.02%
2013	862	−0.46%
2014	878	+1.86%
2015	873	−0.57%
2016	870	−0.34%
