= Breddin =

- Municipality
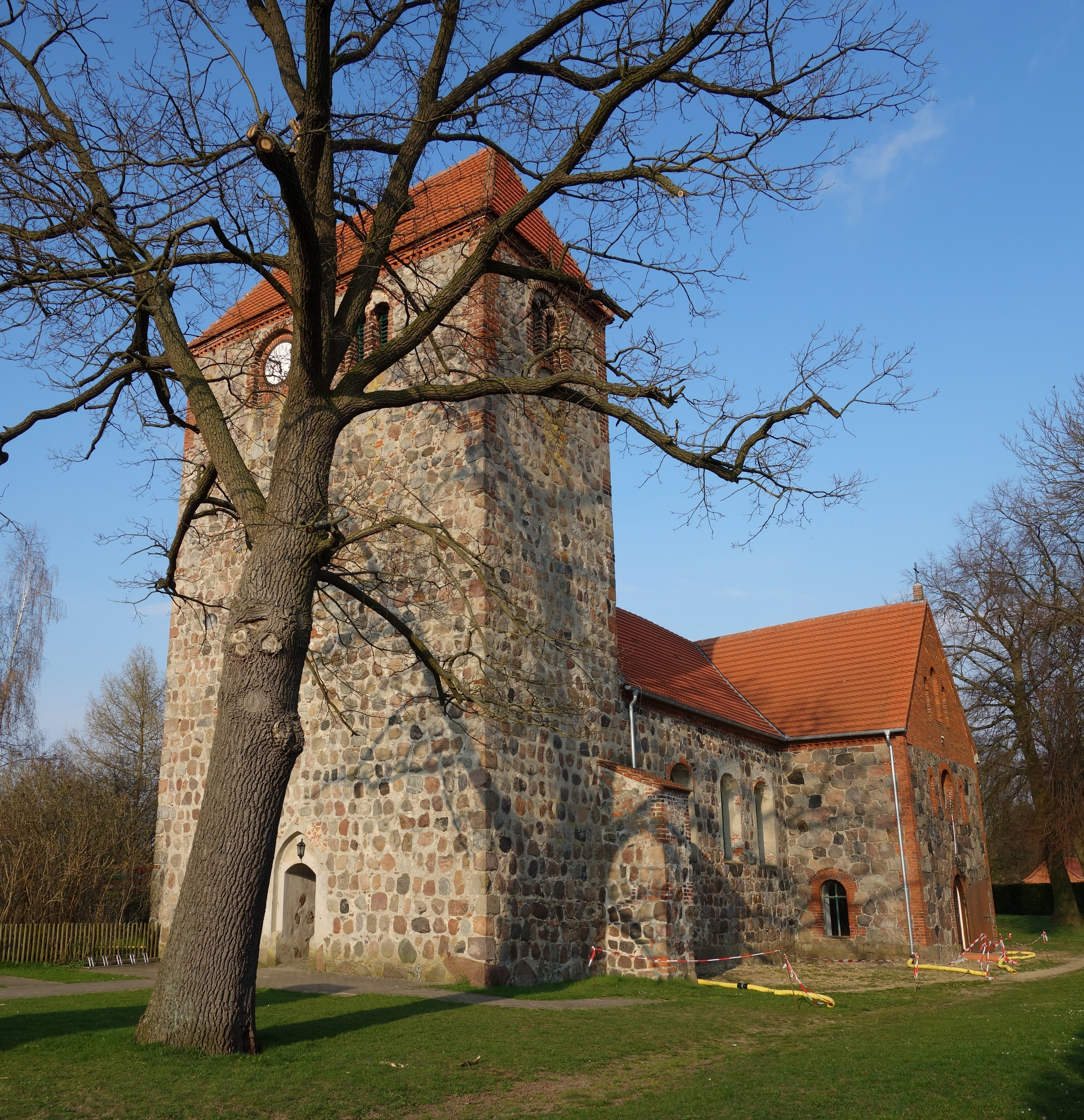
- Village church

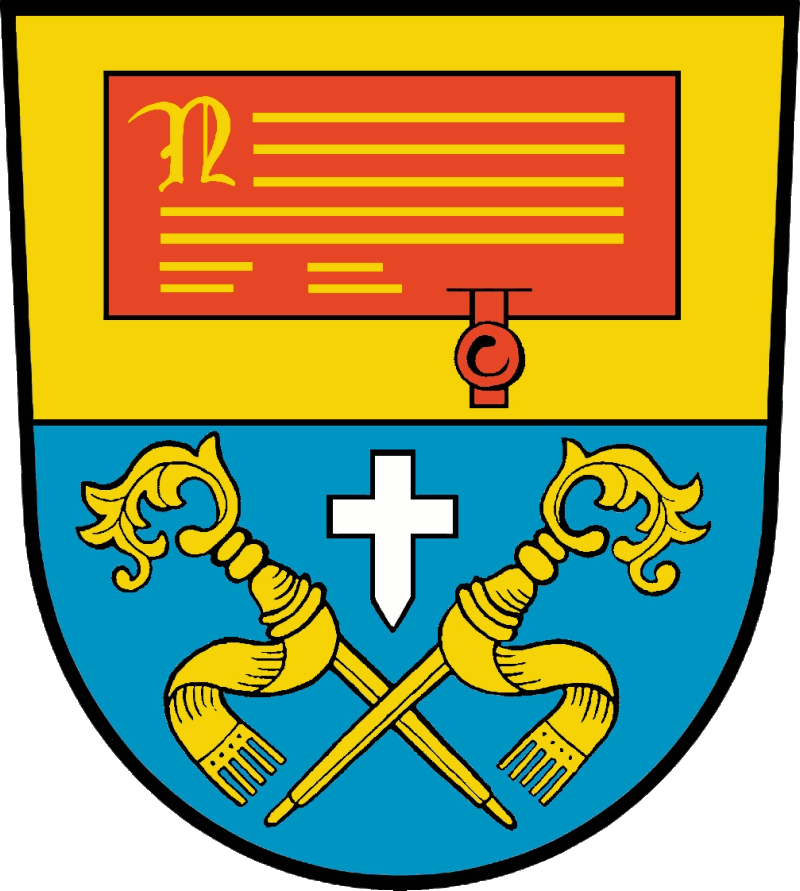
- Coat of arms

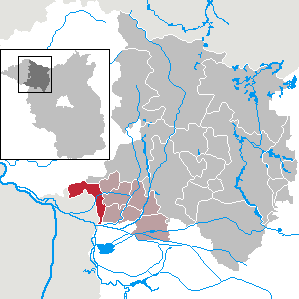
- Location of Breddin within Ostprignitz-Ruppin district
- Interactive map of Breddin
- Location within Germany Location within Brandenburg
- Coordinates: 52°52′59″N 12°13′00″E
- Country: Germany
- State: Brandenburg
- District: Ostprignitz-Ruppin
- Municipal assoc.: Neustadt (Dosse)

Government
  - Mayor (2024–29): Hanno Nebelin

Area
  - Total: 44.74 km^{2} (17.27 sq mi)
- Elevation: 44 m (144 ft)

Population (2025-12-31)
  - Total: 865
  - Density: 19.3/km^{2} (50.1/sq mi)
- Time zone: UTC+01:00 (CET)
  - Summer (DST): UTC+02:00 (CEST)
- Postal codes: 16845
- Dialling codes: 033972
- Vehicle registration: OPR

Breddin is a municipality in the Ostprignitz-Ruppin district, in Brandenburg, Germany.

== History ==
From 1815 to 1945, Breddin was part of the Prussian Province of Brandenburg. From 1952 to 1990, it was part of the Bezirk Potsdam of East Germany.

== Demography ==
Development of population since 1875 within the current boundaries (Blue line: Population; Dotted line: Comparison to population development of Brandenburg state; Grey background: Time of Nazi rule; Red background: Time of communist rule)

Breddin: Population development
within the current boundaries (2013)

Year	Pop.	±% p.a.
1875	1,472	—
1890	1,422	−0.23%
1910	1,540	+0.40%
1925	1,483	−0.25%
1933	1,585	+0.83%
1939	1,565	−0.21%
1946	2,247	+5.30%
1950	2,095	−1.74%
1964	1,579	−2.00%
1971	1,453	−1.18%
1981	1,312	−1.02%
1985	1,340	+0.53%
1989	1,324	−0.30%
1990	1,292	−2.42%
1991	1,259	−2.55%
1992	1,229	−2.38%
1993	1,234	+0.41%
1994	1,235	+0.08%
1995	1,223	−0.97%
1996	1,191	−2.62%

Year	Pop.	±% p.a.
1997	1,187	−0.34%
1998	1,181	−0.51%
1999	1,142	−3.30%
2000	1,120	−1.93%
2001	1,114	−0.54%
2002	1,086	−2.51%
2003	1,066	−1.84%
2004	1,061	−0.47%
2005	1,045	−1.51%
2006	1,042	−0.29%
2007	1,018	−2.30%
2008	1,004	−1.38%
2009	971	−3.29%
2010	934	−3.81%
2011	911	−2.46%
2012	903	−0.88%
2013	888	−1.66%
2014	893	+0.56%
2015	908	+1.68%
2016	886	−2.42%
