= Ostprignitz-Ruppin =

Coordinates: 52°58′N 12°40′E

- District
- Flag Coat of arms
- Country: Germany
- State: Brandenburg
- Capital: Neuruppin

Government
  - District admin.: Ralf Reinhardt (SPD)

Area
  - Total: 2,508.7 km^{2} (968.6 sq mi)

Population (31 December 2025)
  - Total: 98,704
  - Density: 39.345/km^{2} (101.90/sq mi)
- Time zone: UTC+01:00 (CET)
  - Summer (DST): UTC+02:00 (CEST)
- Vehicle registration: OPR, KY, NP, WK
- Website: ostprignitz-ruppin.de

Ostprignitz-Ruppin is a Kreis (district) in the northwestern part of Brandenburg, Germany. Neighboring are (from north clockwise) the districts Ludwigslust-Parchim and Mecklenburgische Seenplatte in Mecklenburg-Western Pomerania, the districts Oberhavel and Havelland, the district Stendal in Saxony-Anhalt, and the district Prignitz.

== Geography ==
The district consists of plain countryside northwest of Berlin. It is densely forested. Many rivers and lakes can be found in its western, its central and its northeastern part. The main river in the district is the Dosse.

== History ==
The district has always been distinguishable from the West Prignitz, having been settled originally by Slavs from a different part of Mecklenburg. It was officially created in 1993 by merging the districts Kyritz, Neuruppin and Wittstock. The district roughly covers the same territory as the two historic districts Ostprignitz and Ruppin. Osprignitz was created in 1815 as one of two districts covering the former county Prignitz, and was split into the districts Kyritz, Pritzwalk and Wittstock in 1952. Also in 1952 the district Ruppin was renamed to Neuruppin and had to give part of its territory to the districts Kyritz and Gransee.

== Demography ==
Development of Population since 1875 within the Current Boundaries (Blue Line: Population; Dotted Line: Comparison to Population Development of Brandenburg state)

Recent Population Development and Projections (Population Development before Census 2011 (blue line); Recent Population Development according to the Census in Germany in 2011 (blue bordered line); Official projections for 2005-2030 (yellow line); for 2014-2030 (red line); for 2017-2030 (scarlet line)

Landkreis Ostprignitz-Ruppin: Population development
within the current boundaries (2025)

Year	Pop.	±% p.a.
1875	101,605	—
1890	102,153	+0.04%
1910	102,634	+0.02%
1925	106,311	+0.23%
1933	109,576	+0.38%
1939	114,606	+0.75%
1946	157,875	+4.68%
1950	153,496	−0.70%
1964	124,190	−1.50%
1971	123,486	−0.08%

Year	Pop.	±% p.a.
1981	119,269	−0.35%
1985	120,184	+0.19%
1990	118,794	−0.23%
1995	116,005	−0.47%
2000	112,930	−0.54%
2005	108,027	−0.88%
2010	102,868	−0.97%
2015	99,110	−0.74%
2020	98,808	−0.06%
2025	98,704	−0.02%

== Coat of arms ==
The eagle in the top of the coat of arms derives from the Counts of Arnstein, who ruled Ruppin in the 13th century. To the left is a fleur-de-lis representing the Counts von Plotho, a Wendish family who ruled Kyritz, where they had migrated from the Magdeburg area bringing German families such as the von Blumenthals with them. The mitre to the right symbolizes Wittstock, as Bishop Heinrich I made Wittstock the capital of the Prince-Bishopric of Havelberg.

== Towns and municipalities ==
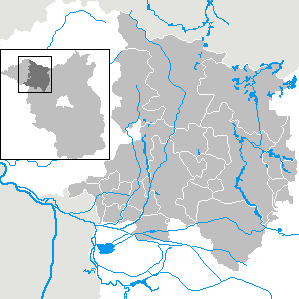
Clickable map of towns and municipalities in the district

Amt-free towns	Ämter
1. Kyritz; 2. Neuruppin; 3. Rheinsberg; 4. Wittstock; Amt-free municipalities: 1. Fehrbellin; 2. Heiligengrabe; 3. Wusterhausen	1. Lindow (Mark); 1. Herzberg; 2. Lindow^{1, 2}; 3. Rüthnick; 4. Vielitzsee; 2. Neustadt (Dosse); 1. Breddin; 2. Dreetz; 3. Neustadt an der Dosse^{1, 2}; 4. Sieversdorf-Hohenofen; 5. Stüdenitz-Schönermark; 6. Zernitz-Lohm	3. Temnitz; 1. Dabergotz; 2. Märkisch Linden; 3. Storbeck-Frankendorf; 4. Temnitzquell; 5. Temnitztal; 6. Walsleben^{1}
^{1}seat of the Amt; ²town
