= Banzendorf =

- Ortsteil of Lindow
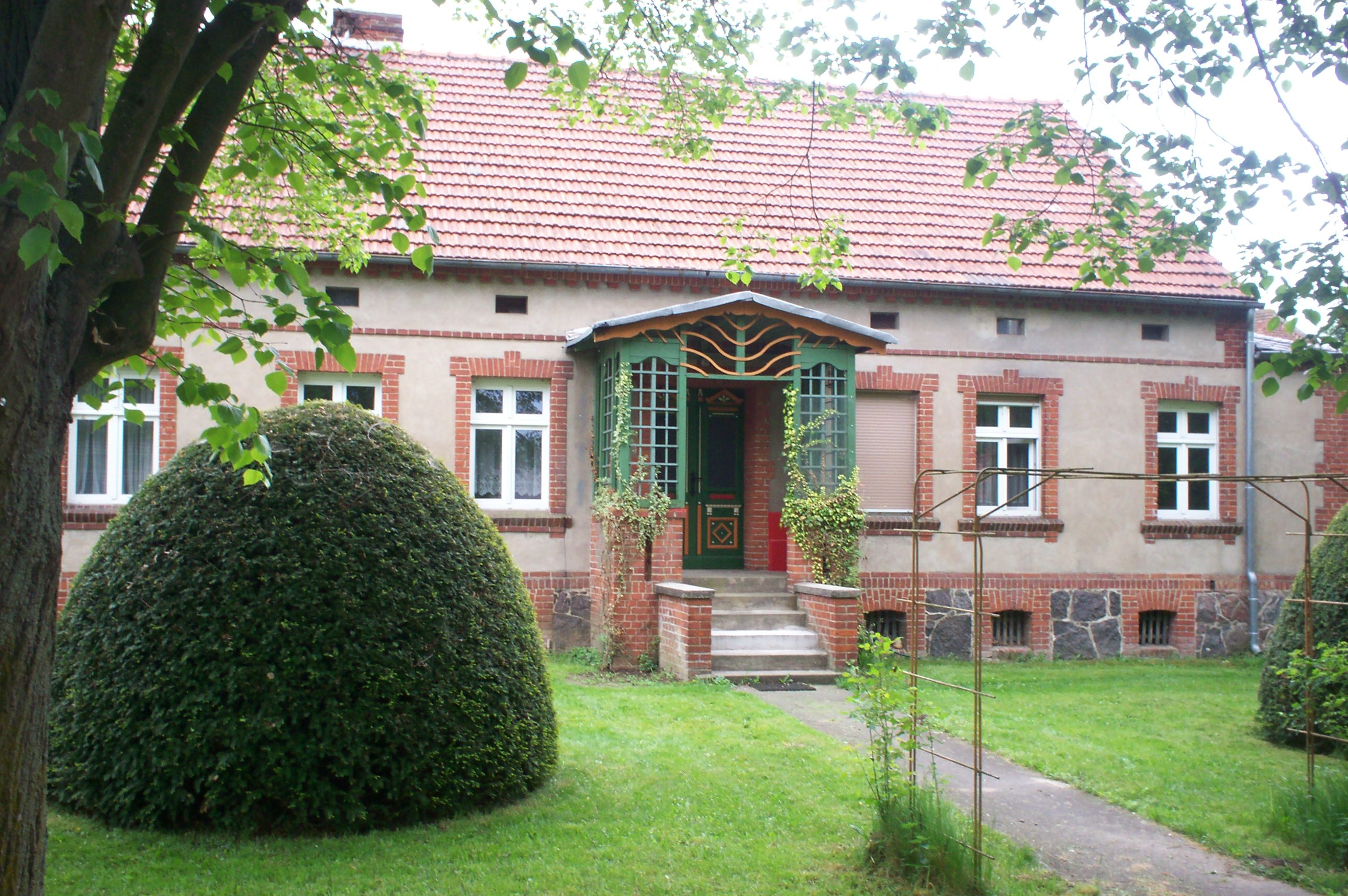
- House #9, Banzendorfer Straße
- Interactive map of Banzendorf
- Location within Germany Location within Brandenburg
- Coordinates: 53°0′54″N 12°59′54″E
- Country: Germany
- State: Brandenburg
- District: Ostprignitz-Ruppin
- Municipality: Lindow

Area
  - Total: 10.17 km^{2} (3.93 sq mi)

Population (2001)
  - Total: 173
  - Density: 17.0/km^{2} (44.1/sq mi)
- Time zone: UTC+01:00 (CET)
  - Summer (DST): UTC+02:00 (CEST)
- Postal codes: 16835
- Dialling codes: 033933
- Vehicle registration: OPR

Banzendorf is a village in the state of Brandenburg, Germany. Since the end of 2001 it is a component locality (Ortsteil) of the municipality of Lindow, Ostprignitz-Ruppin district.

== Geography ==
Banzendorf is located 7 kilometres (4.3 mi) north of Lindow. Banzendorf is a linear village with only few houses situated in the alleys. The village location itself is flat, but there are also some hills in the vicinity of Banzendorf, especially northeast at its outlying hamlet Rudershof. In the southwest of the village Dierberg Heath (Dierberger Heide) is spreading. Banzendorf is directly connected by streets and alleys with Dierberg (Dierberger Weg), Hindenberg (Banzendorfer Straße, forming the main street and district road No. K6604), Lindow (Lindower Weg), Rönnebeck in Brandenburg (Rönnebecker Weg) and Schulzendorf in Ruppin Land (Schulzendorfer Weg). In 1993 the 10.17 square kilometres, or 1,017 hectares (ha), of Banzendorf comprised 902 hectares (2,230 acres) of agricultural area (84.2% of the total), 99 hectares (240 acres) of forests (9.2%), 32 hectares (79 acres) of circulation area (3%), 17 hectares (42 acres) of built-up area and pertaining open space (1.6%), 6 hectares (15 acres) of water bodies (0.6%) and 15 hectares (37 acres) of various other usages (1.4%).

== History ==
=== As part of the County of Ruppin ===
Banzendorf's oldest recorded mentioning dates back to 1365 under the name of «casa Banzendorp». In the course of the medieval eastward migrations of Germans Gebhard I, Count of Arnstein had conquered the area around today's Banzendorf and in 1196 he settled in the castle of Ruppin, located in today's Alt Ruppin, a locality of Neuruppin. The comital family, later called counts of Lindow-Ruppin, established the County of Ruppin, of which Banzendorf formed a part. The county was no imperial county, immediately under the emperors, but the counts held it mediately as a subfief of the March of Brandenburg.

By 1220 or 1240 the counts founded a Cistercian nunnery in Lindow and richly enfeoffed it with lands and villages, whose inhabitants became serfs to the nunnery. Also other noble families endowed the nunnery with additional land or revenues from dues (to be performed by serfs) in order to maintain a decent life for the nuns, usually unmarried daughters or childless widows of the same noble families. Banzendorf was one of altogether 18 villages enfeoffed to the nunnery. However, the Banzendorfers had to render their socages to the counts of Ruppin.

An appointed village mayor (Schultheiß in High German, Dorfschulze, i.e. village bailiff, in the local tradition) in Banzendorf is recorded the first time for the year 1420. Then the Lindow Nunnery listed in its records of serfs obliged to perform dues for Banzendorf 14 serf farmer families tilling tenured land and seven cotters (Kossäten; derived from Kate, cottage, and Sate, someone seated on a plot) holding only tiny gardens and earning their livelihood as farmhands. Whereas the feudal rent for the meadows was to paid to the counts of Ruppin. In 1422 the foreign robber baron Rehmer von Plessen from the close by Duchy of Mecklenburg ravaged the village, then called Banzendorppe, with 30 armed men (among them members of the families of Blücher and Feldberg) also shooting dead the Schulze.

=== After the reversion of Ruppin county to Brandenburg ===
With the extinction of the comital family in the male line the comital fief was reverted to the liege lord, the prince-elector of Brandenburg in 1524. After the Marcher electors had adopted Lutheranism in 1539 officials of the new Lutheran state church assessed in Banzendorf that there was a pastorate endowed with two Hufen (1 Marcher Hufe then measured about 17.0215 hectares (42.061 acres)) for maintaining the pastor and his family. Banzendorf's population adopted Lutheranism in the course of the Reformation.

In 1541/1542 the highly indebted elector secularised the nunnery and took its fiefs. The former fiefs of the nunnery were now administered by the electoral Amt Lindow, a fiscal unit, collecting the dues and rents previously paid to the nuns and wielding the latter's former patrimonial privileges including the advowson of Banzendorf Village Church. On the occasion of the electoral takeover the serfs were counted. There were - their family members not separately mentioned - one Schultheiss, one innkeeper (Krüger), 15 farmers (Hüfner) holding tenured land measuring at least one Hufe, seven cotters, one smith, one cowherd and one shepherd.

In the Thirty Years' War the warfaring parties (such as Danish and imperial troops in 1627, Swedish troops in 1635) ravaged Banzendorf several times and in 1631 the plague killed even more people. Jeremias Ludewig recalled that as a choir boy he had to sing at about 800 funerals in several villages. The Catholic League invaded and ravaged the area in 1638. On 18 October the Leaguist General Matthias Gallas robbed and burnt the Lindow Convent. 28 further villages in the area were ravaged and burnt. Many of the survivors fled the area in order to find a survival elsewhere.

So in 1652 according to the Landesvisitation 13 out of Banzendorf's 25 farmsteads were vacant. In 1660 the farmers of Banzendorf practised a two-year crop rotation as part of the Flurzwang. In 1665 the bigger part of the village burnt down, including the pastorate. Afterwards no new pastor was appointed but the Dierberg pastor additionally served in Banzendorf. In 1687 still ten farmsteads were vacant, and only in 1773 all farms had been settled again. In 1688 the village counted 54 residential buildings, 90 agricultural and production buildings, among them two brick bakeries and a mill, and five buildings serving public purposes.

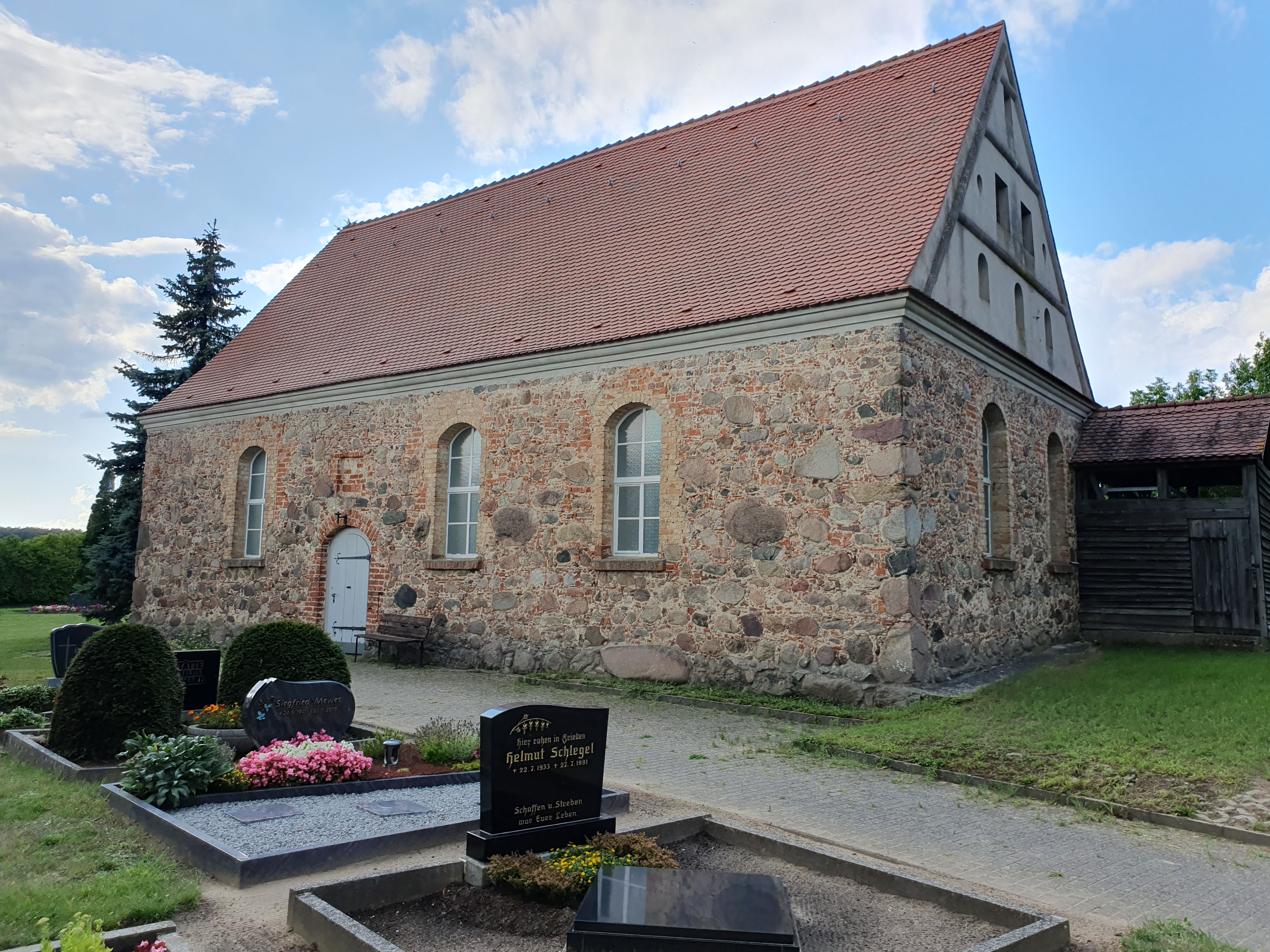
The Village Church seen from south, 2024

The Marcher electors, vassals of the Holy Roman Empire, were since 1618 also ruling as Dukes of Prussia as vassals of Poland. After Prussia had regained its souzerainty from Poland in 1657, the dukes upgraded themselves to Prussian king in 1701. With kings ranking higher than electors the name of that foreign country and the royal title started being used even for the rulers' possessions within the Empire. In 1709 the Banzendorf church was officially downgraded to an affiliate of the Dierberg church. By a reform of the local jurisdiction Banzendorf became the seat of a local court (Schulzengericht) presided over by the Schulze. In 1748 and 1753 Banzendorf, like all agriculture in the area, suffered from misharvests with potatoes. Banzendorf's Schulze Ernst Christian Köhler, who had been granted the licence to develop and settle the new neighbouring village of Hindenberg, was sued for having brewed beer and sold it along with liqueurs between 1754 and 1759, which he would have only been allowed to do after having completed the settling of Hindenberg. The immediate liege lord of the Banzendorf peasants was the respective ruler of Brandenburg-Prussia.

In 1761 and again in 1762 farmers of Wulkow near Neuruppin demanded the meadows in the close by Neukammerluch wetlands (since 2003 a part of Neuruppin), which, however, were assigned to the Schulze of Banzendorf. In 1764 Banzendorf was reassigned to Amt Rheinsberg, another fiscal unit seated in Rheinsberg. Two years later the Amt Rheinsberg counted 31 hearthes and 185 inhabitants in Banzendorf. On 25 May 1773 a herdsman's home burnt down. On 9 January 1782 two farms burnt down in Banzendorf. Two years later on 2 March a fire destroyed two other farms, which were reconstructed in the following years. In 1798 Banzendorf counted twelve full farmers (reaching at least the minimum farmland holding), one half farmer, four full cotters and 31 Hufen of land altogether, among them two of the pastorate, mostly classified second degree soil quality. The population pyramid of that year was severely distorted, 127 inhabitants above the age of 14, among them 34 without marriage permission, had 93 children under 14. Thus - roughly calculating, leaving aside possible child deaths and further children born in the considered period – within the following 14 years all these children came into working age almost doubling the labour force intown, without any reason to expect an economic growth allowing for a livelihood acceptable for them, or let alone a similar number of deceasing adults leaving behind their positions. The upcoming Napoleonic wars then would absorb and exhaust many of the young men, a phenomenon also called infanticide déféré by Gaston Bouthoul. In 1798 the livestock comprised 68 horses, 70 oxen, 44 cows, 29 calves, 67 young cattle and 595 sheep. The Marcher public fire insurance (Feuersocietät) counted in 1799 31 hearthes (homesteads) which were all insured with a total amount assured of Rixdollar 9,850.

=== Since the liberation of the serfs ===
In 1799 the king as their landlord had unilaterally abolished most of the personal labour duties of the peasants in the royal demesnes, so also relieving the Banzendorfers, without demanding any compensation. In 1800 the serfs of Banzendorf paid their remaining dues, meanwhile monetarised, to the demesne administration of Amt Zechlin in Flecken Zechlin. Two years later the Amt Zechlin ordered the formation of local funds for the poor (Ortsarmenkasse), providing since also for Banzendorf's poor a minimum support. In a dispute with their pastor in 1804 the parishioners of Banzendorf and neighbouring Dierberg refused to deliver him their due renders.

By the October Edict of 7 October 1807 the Prussian government liberated all remaining serfs and allodified all feudal land tenures, however, leaving unclear whether the land will become property of the landlords or of those who till it. In 1808 the land they tilled was assigned as their private allodial property to all former royal serfs, thus also to the Banzendorfers, without any payment, whereas the so-called regulation of rights and duties (German: Regulierung) of the other than royal former serfs to their respective landlords only started by the Regulation Edict of 14 September 1811, extending into the 1850s and with compensations to be paid for the assigned property rights, in some cases even paid down up to the year 1900.

Serfdom and the various other estates statuses were replaced by the Prussian citizenship in 1810. The liberation of the serfs was accompanied by the abolition of serf restrictions on marriage, prompting the population rise in the course of the 19th century. Whereas in 1805 Banzendorf's population amounted to 242 inhabitants, the number rose to 318 in 1840 and 453 in 1861. The starting industrialisation of Berlin, and especially the western provinces of Prussia, but also in Brandenburg itself absorbed the rural excess population else without any chance to earn their livelihood in the agriculture (rural exodus).

In the course of establishing the new Prussian system of districts as higher than municipality level administration Banzendorf became part of the District of Ruppin in 1818, recalling the former county's name. As to the fiscal unit, now levying taxes but not feudal dues anymore, Banzendorf stayed in the ambit of Amt Zechlin.

The feudal customary land tillers, once threatened by poverty and starvation, but inalienably possessing the land unless not convicted for felony, had been converted into land proprietors threatened by eventual bankruptcy entailing the foreclosure of their property rights. This obliged them to commercialise their customary rather subsistential agriculture transforming it into agrarian business. Of course the Flurzwang was abolished, being in contradiction to free agrarian business. But their new status as proprietors also enabled them to borrow money against their property rights, now alienable and thus executable what made them acceptable as security for creditors. Credits financed investment in production improvements. Starting in 1821 the traditional inalienable commons possessions in lands, forests and water bodies were transformed by law into common property rights, making the former commons beneficiaries common proprietors entitled to sell, separate or keep at their will the concerned real estate. By the 1840s the yields per hectare had considerally been risen.

In 1831 the Banzendorfer Georg Ziehm established by his last will an endowment of Thaler 100 with the annual interest of which to be spent for the pupils. In 1840 the local jurisdiction of the Schulzengericht was dissolved in favour of courts with professional judiciary in Lindow. At a fire between September 9–10, 1848 organised fire fighting is recorded for the first time in Banzendorf. The new causeway of 1849 between Lindow and Rheinsberg via Klosterheide bypassed Banzendorf, while the old main highway from Lindow to Banzendorf turned into a second-class highway. The number of residential houses amounted to 53 in 1861, thus one less than in 1688, whereas the population had more than doubled in the past 100 years. In 1867 another fire destroyed some farms which were soon rebuilt.

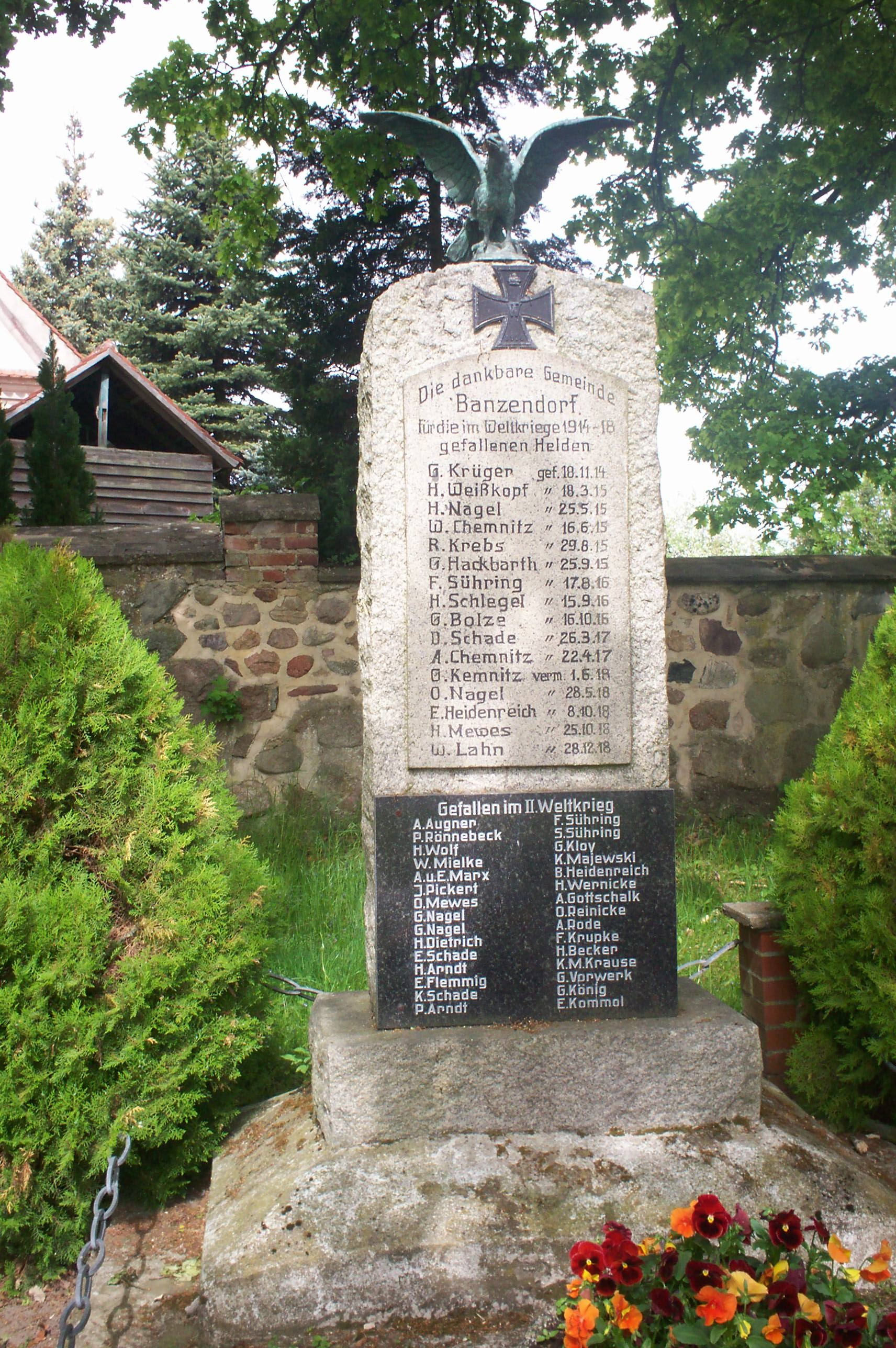
Memorial for the soldiers killed in action in the two World Wars

After the Franco-German War of 1870 and 1871 a war veteran association was founded in 1881, losing its fund of monies alienated by the member Heidenreich in 1908. By the turn of the 20th century the self-help group of firefighters formed the volunteer fire brigade. After the First World War Banzendorf was connected to the electricity grid in 1919. Two years later the memorial for the soldiers killed in that war, preserved until today, was inaugurated in front of the church. With the falling number of children per family and the ongoing rural exodus the population continued to shrink, reaching in 1928 the number of 333 persons in Banzendorf including the northeasterly outlying hamlet of Rudershof. Pupils from Banzendorf and neighbouring villages then attended school in the village. Ilse Dörffeldt, formerly anchoring at the 1936 Summer Olympics the German 4 × 100 m relay team that was in the lead when she dropped the baton, was one of their teachers. Living later many years in Berlin she was buried on the Banzendorf churchyard in 1992. A junction line between the Lake Stechlin railway (Stechlinseebahn, operating from 1930 to 1945) and the Löwenberg-Lindow-Rheinsberg railway (still active) was southerly tangent to Banzendorf, however, not with a station there but in Rönnebeck.

=== Under Nazi rule ===
The small village society was rather less hit by the first dictatorial measurements aiming at democrats, and communists, and also anti-Semitic and racist discrimination of Jews and Gypsies did not find direct targets in Banzendorf. But with the transformation of the German economy from an open economy competing in world business into a command production system under austerity and autarky apt for war production, agriculture played an important role. Also within the garbled Nazi ideology farmers were hailed as workers in concrete matters without any over-spiritualisation, which Nazis considered to be decadent, as breeders of children and livestock (Cf. Blood and soil). As part of the statalist and corporatist restructuring of the German production system non-Jewish farmers, if deemed to be of good so-called "Aryan" genes, could get their farm property transformed into an inalienable heredium, neither sellable for commercial reasons nor alienable by way of foreclosure, and to be bequeathed undivided only to one heir (Cf. Reichserbhofgesetz). Of course banks granted no credits to such farms anymore, since their houses and land were no real estate anymore but inalienable.

The volunteer fire brigade, like all over Nazi Germany was militarised in the 1930s, preparing for their future employment in the massive destructions expected in aerial warfare. In the course of the Second World War farmers were increasingly subjected to delivery compulsions, using the Nazi farmers organisations as means of control. While farmhands, sons and even farmers were recruited for the Wehrmacht forced labourers from German-occupied Europe replaced them.

In January 1945 the refugees of the trek from Schönborn in the New March were billeted in the houses of the Banzendorfers, raising its population number to the all-time peak of 523 (as of December 1945), among them 254 refugees. By May 5 Soviet troops occupied Banzendorf without any fight. The population was allowed to stay since as part of the Soviet zone of occupation the area was not to be handed over to Poland like the home villages of the refugees. The forced labourers were freed and could return to their home countries: Tragic was the fate of many forced labourers from the Soviet Union facing at home accusations as collaborators and at times even punishments like forced labour in Siberia.

=== Under Soviet occupation ===
The rails of Lake Stechlin railway and its junction line were demounted in summer 1945 and transported to the Soviet Union. In September the same year the Soviets started massive uncompensated expropriations of people considered in communism to belong to the so-called exploiting class. In harsh contrast to the pretended communist principle of equality all proprietors holding 100 hectares (250 acres) of land or more were not expropriated the land exceeding this limit but entirely. In Banzendorf no farmer reached the mentioned limit and there were no abandoned farms of people who had fled before the Soviet conquest.

After the war (1945–1950) the ongoing expropriations and expulsions of German citizens in Polish-occupied and annexed former Eastern Germany and the starting expropriations, denaturalisations and expulsions of Czechoslovaks, Hungarians, and Poles of German ethnicity in their home countries caused more and more destitute homeless to be absorbed in Allied-occupied Germany. Banzendorf replied Soviet orders to further absorb expellees declaring its capacity were exceeded. In the 1946 elections, in September for municipal parliaments and in October for the Brandenburg Landtag, although both under Soviet undue preferential treatment of the communists (SED) still the first and only elections under Soviet rule allowing other parties to openly compete for seats, in Banzendorf only the LDPD and the SED ran candidates. This was typical for villages in the Soviet zone, because with very restricted technical, logistical and media support the non-communist parties hardly managed to establish structures and win partisans in smaller localities like Banzendorf. Its electorate then comprised 312 persons, of whom 200 were women and 112 men.

In order to feed the increased population in Allied-occupied Germany, whose soil had been reduced by 25% through annexations, requisitioning, rationing and the delivery duties were strongly severed, as was the compulsion to enforce these regulations. In 1948 Mayor Erwin Theiß, who had granted slaughter permits to some farmers in order to safeguard Banzendorf's nutrition, was sued under the severed Soviet laws of delivery obligation with three months of prison for withholding livestock from delivery to the authorities. Hermann Schenk became the mayor on 1 April 1948. Farmer Alfred Brunow was fined in December for having thrashed grain which was to be delivered.

Unlike the Trizone, where rationing of food had ended since June 1948 with the introduction of a currency issued only in refinancing operations whereby the central bank only credited business operations really stipulated by businesses, the Soviet zone and succeeding East Germany continued rationing (for food till May 1958) and delivery compulsions. The new currency of the Soviet zone continued to be deliberately issued by authorities following communist prerogatives of rather wishful growth phantasies. Thus the authoritative over-issuance made the currency supply not reflecting the real level of business operations. The authorities' preferring communist-controlled production entities when distributing funds empowering them to buy a bigger share of the domestic product without having performed better. This arbitrary character of the currency combined with high taxation and authoritatively fixed maximum prices made it impossible for private enterprises to compensate for the defective quality of the currency by increasing margins and prices. So the remaining private sector was systematically discouraged to increase efforts and remained thus under government compulsion, whereas shortages of consumer goods and government rationing of primary products and means of production perpetuated throughout the East German period.

=== East German period ===
After the Trizone constituted as the west German Federal Republic of Germany in May 1949, in October the Soviets established in their zone the East German Democratic Republic, of which Banzendorf formed a part. Compulsion in agricultural production continued. In May 1950 the authorities started investigations against Willi Heidenreich for bad economic management, not only a personal misfortune but made a crime then, after he was in delay with the compulsory deliveries. In July 1950 Banzendorf's relatively wealthy farmer family Degebrodt was expropriated their larger units of agricultural machines, such as a SB 34 1290 tractor, in favour of the Farmers Mutual Aid Association (Vereinigung der gegenseitigen Bauernhilfe; VdgB), established in autumn 1945.

This organisation with local committees, comprising the farmers whom the communists considered to be the "good" guys or at least useful beadles for their purposes, was granted the disposal over certain expropriated agricultural stocks and machines, thus compromising the one farmers to collaborate with communism and dispose of former property of their fellows, who were stigmatised by the communists as the "bad" guys to be expropriated – generally following the Macchiavellist principle of divide et impera. Although claiming to be for the farmers' benefit the VdgB became an instrument to accustom and prepare the farmers to their future compulsory collectivisation.

In September the VdgB sold Degebrodt's former tools rather than use them, a decision maybe determined by the village climate creating odd feelings if farmers use their neighbour's former belongings. The already streamlined Brandenburgian umbrella organisation sharply criticised this sale claiming the local VdgB should have handed over the expropriated machinery to the locally competent Maschinen-Ausleih-Station (MAS; machine loan-out station), a government-run organisation claiming expropriated agricultural machinery and putting it out on loan to farmers without such machines. The local VdgB was disciplined and ordered to pay the sales proceeds to the MAS. The Degebrodt family fled East Germany.

In 1953, in the course of the communist collectivisation of the agriculture started in 1952, Banzendorf's farmers were urged to join the local Landwirtschaftliche Produktionsgenossenschaft (LPG, Agricultural Production Comradeship or Community; the East German variants of the kolkhoz). At first it was an LPG of type I which meant the farmers' lands were cultivated under a collective plan, a kind of modern Flurzwang, whereas livestock and machinery was kept familywise. Until 1960 all farmers of Banzendorf had joined the LPG. In 1968 Banzendorf's LPG became part of the superior planning unit Kooperative Abteilung Pflanzenproduktion (cooperative department of plant production) and as such an LPG of type III, meaning land, machinery, livestock and agricultural buildings were used according to central prerogatives. Since 1968 Banzendorf's LPG also tilled fields previously used by the LPG in neighbouring Dierberg, whereas the latter's LPG specialised in livestock taking on Banzendorf's livestock. So central stables and barns were constructed in Dierberg close to the street to Banzendorf, whereas the stables and barns in private farmsteads were evacuated, except for little stock of small domestic animals allowed for private maintenance.

=== After the end of communism and since reunification ===
In November 1989 the LPG Dierberg was transformed into a public limited company. Three of Banzendorf's farmers withdrew their land, never expropriated but only dispossessed by the LPGs, and restarted family farming in the scope of a federal programme (Cf. Wiedereinrichter). They specialised in breeding cows, beef cattle and horses. Fields owned by the other former farming families are partially leased to the three farmers or to other agrobusinesses which have emerged from former LPGs.

The war memorial of 1921, which had been buried during the Soviet occupation, was reerected, after its excavation, and added a plaque of names of the soldiers from Banzendorf killed in the Second World War. Between 1992 and 2001 the municipality of Banzendorf had managed its administrative tasks with other municipalities in the Amt Lindow, no fiscal unit but a kind of common municipal administration. Several former farmsteads have been sold and are now used by Berliners and others as countryside cottages. The successor of the former LPG Dierberg was liquidated in 1997. After the pensioned director of the district construction department had moved to Banzendorf the main street got a new pavement between 1997 and 1998 for first time also including paved sidewalks. In 1999 the Lindower Weg alley to Lindow was paved as an intramunicipal connection.

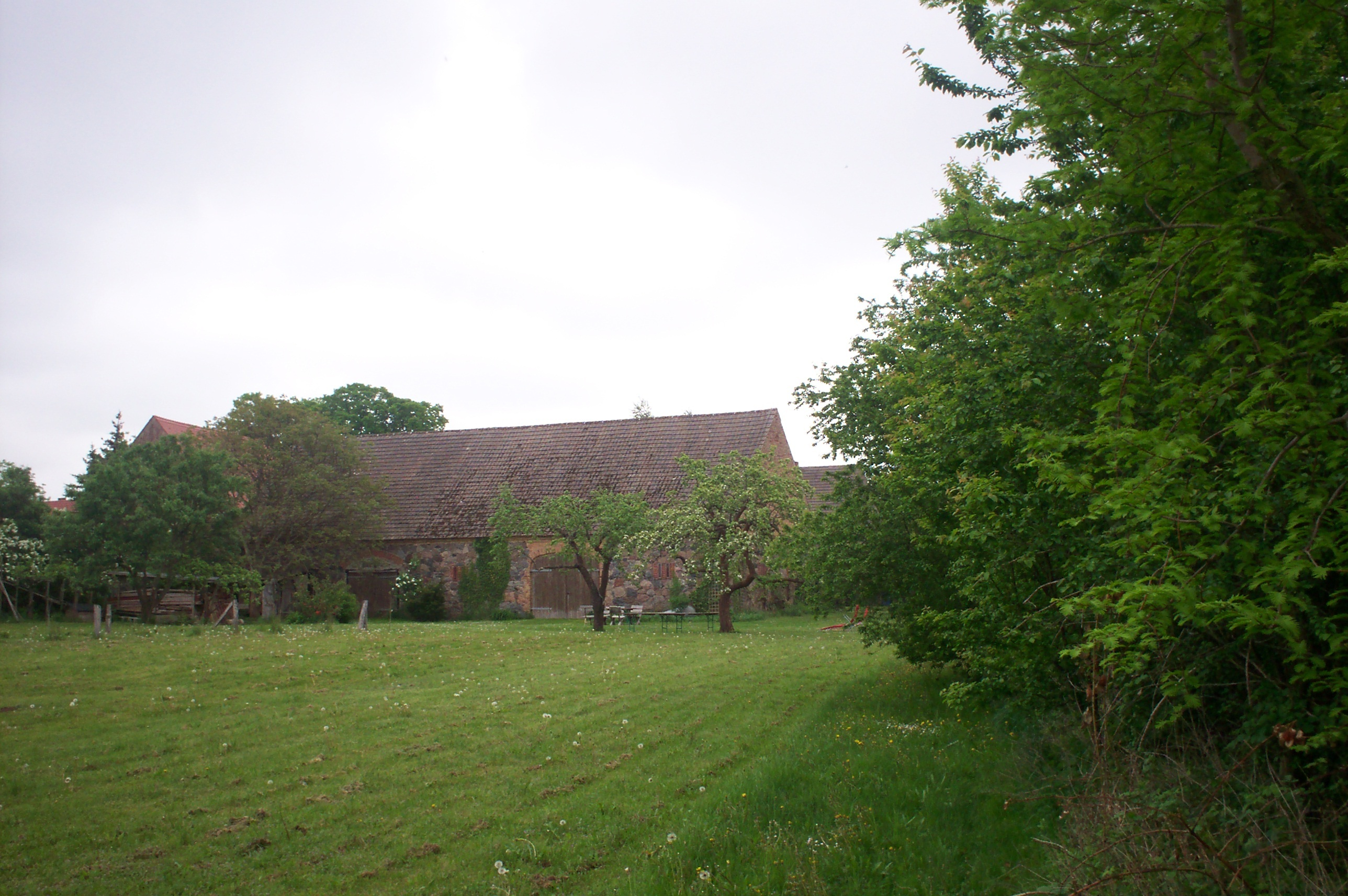
Barn housing the Banzendorfer Kulturscheune (culture barn) between 1999 and 2011.

On 29 May 1999, attended by Brandenburg's minister for culture Steffen Reiche, a new cultural venue had opened its gates in the village, the Banzendorfer Kulturscheune (Banzendorf culture barn). In a rebuilt barn Ulrike von Soden-Köpcke and the singer Niels Köpcke installed a concert and lecture venue with a capacity of more than 300 spectators. In 2000 Banzendorf celebrated the 635th anniversary of its first recorded mentioning.

The village inn was given up in the 21st century, whereas the traditional bakery, established in 1904, with a little village shop continues to supply the Banzendorfers. On 1 September 2001 Banzendorf and Jemiołów concluded a partnership between the two villages, signed by their mayors Peter Wilbers and Stanisław Mucha in Banzendorf. Suffering from the German demographic crisis Banzendorf and other municipalities formally merged into Lindow in 2001. In January 2007 the volunteer fire brigade was dissolved. In 2011 the Kulturscheune closed down again. There are two listed monuments of cultural heritage in Banzendorf. One is the gravesite of the Degebrodt family and the other the village church.

== Village church ==
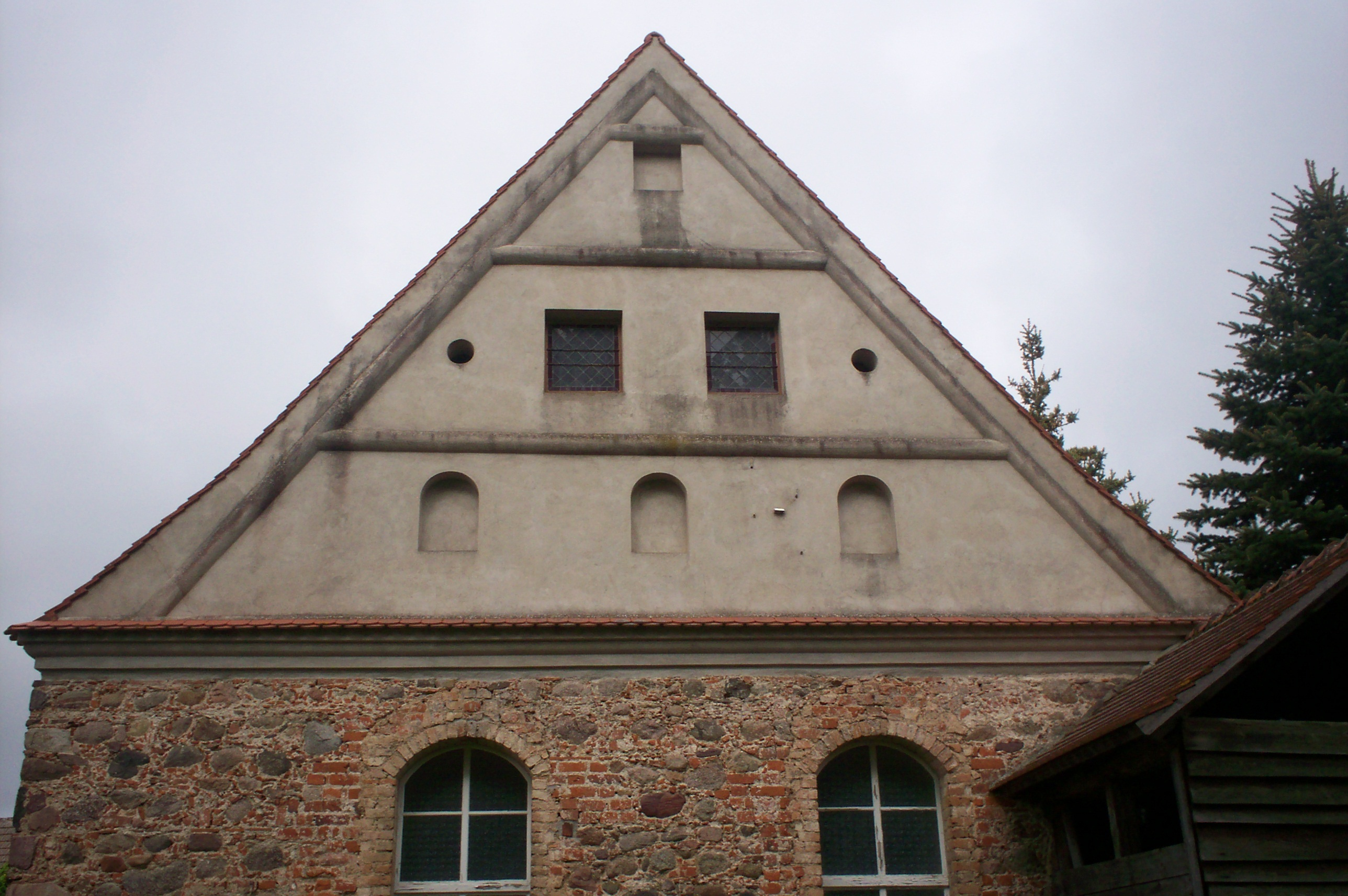
Village Church: Eastern gable with top of the scaffolding for the bells (right below)

The Lutheran village church was probably built in 1640, at least this year is given on its weathervane. The present church of boulders and brick replaced an earlier building which Cistercian monks had built in 1263 from boulders. The records kept by the competent liege lord the Lindow Nunnery were burnt with the convent's library and archive by the Catholic Leaguist troops in 1638. The walls of boulders measure a thickness of 1 metre (3.3 ft). The gables are laid of brick.

The current church is a rectangular single-nave church covered by a gabled roof. Its former wooden tower, erected in the 17th century at the western end of the nave, was so dilapidated and the Evangelical Church in Berlin-Brandenburg, eastern synod, the competent umbrella of which the Banzendorf congregation formed a part at that time, was financially so weak after having lost most of its parishioners during the communist regime, that the tower had to be torn down in 1971. The church bell is hanging since in an open scaffolding in front of the eastern gable of the church. The interior hall of the church with an even ceiling is adorned by a typical Protestant pulpit altar created in 1718 by Georg Kleist from Gransee. The pulpit altar shows acanthus-formed wood carving at its stairs and side panels. The pulpit is flanked by turned columns. The pulpit ceiling is formed like a crown. The organ of 1889 was created by Albert Hollenbach although some sources mention Friedrich Hermann Lütkemüller as organ builder.

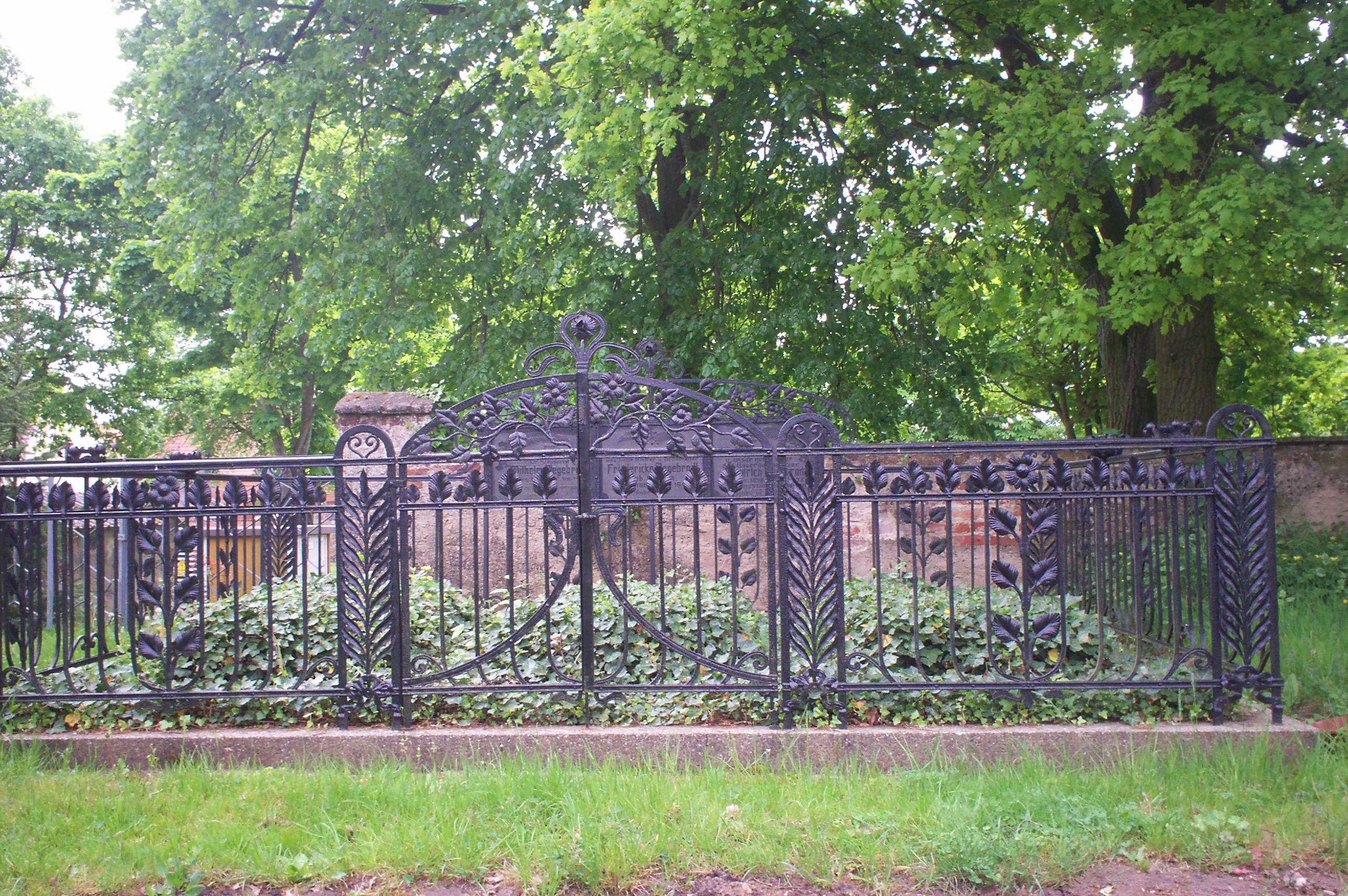
Gravesite of the Degebrodt family

The church is surrounded by the cemetery being a church yard. In the southeastern corner there is a little mortuary renovated in 1996. In the northeastern corner of the church yard there is the Degebrodt gravesite. It was erected after 1912. The gravesite is hedged by an iron fence in Jugendstil design. Plaques commemorate Wilhelm, Friedrich and Fridericke Degebrodt. West of the church there is the gravesite of Ilse Dörffeldt and her mother Marie Dörffeldt (née Nagel; 1880–1952).

== Population ==
Inhabitants of Banzendorf (Pop.)
Year	Pop.	±%
1766	185	—
1785	206	+11.4%
1798	220	+6.8%
1805	242	+10.0%
1840	318	+31.4%
1858	405	+27.4%
1861	453	+11.9%
1875	355	−21.6%
1890	368	+3.7%
1910	320	−13.0%
1925	326	+1.9%
1933	333	+2.1%
1939	334	+0.3%
1945	523	+56.6%
1946	543	+3.8%
1950	444	−18.2%
1964	317	−28.6%
1971	284	−10.4%
1981	232	−18.3%
1990	217	−6.5%
1995	191	−12.0%
2000	173	−9.4%
2006	170	−1.7%
2009	150	−11.8%
2011	148	−1.3%
Note: In 1945 including 253 war refugees Source: See footnote.

== Mayors ==
- 1990–2008: Peter Wilbers
- 2008–2010: Karl-Heinrich Rosenfelder
- 2010–date: Bernd-Ulrich Müller
