= Gudelacksee =

Lake in Lindow, Brandenburg, Germany

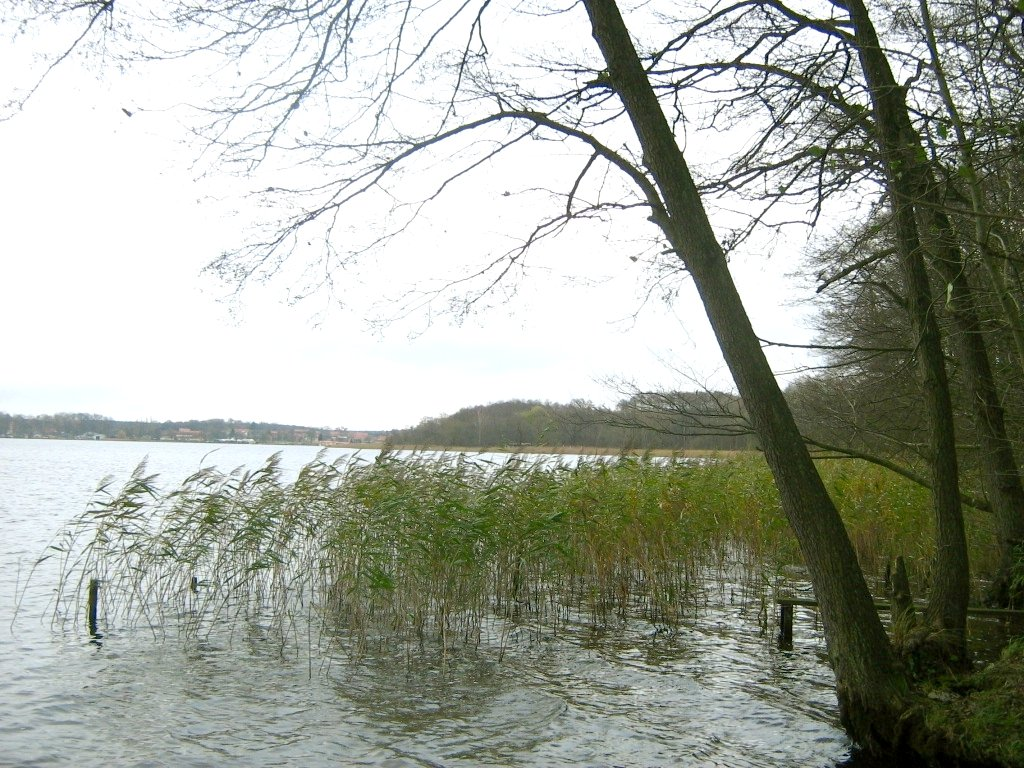

- Location within Brandenburg
- Location: Ostprignitz-Ruppin, Brandenburg
- Coordinates: 52°59′0″N 12°57′0″E
- Primary inflows: Vielitz Canal, Lindower Stadtfließ
- Primary outflows: Lindower Rhin
- Basin countries: Germany
- Surface area: 4.38 km^{2} (1.69 sq mi)
- Max. depth: 36 m (118 ft)
- Surface elevation: 52 m (171 ft)

The Gudelacksee is a German lake in Lindow, in the county of Ostprignitz-Ruppin, Brandenburg. Lake Gudelack is connected to the lakes Lake Möllen and Lake Vielitz. It has an elevation of 52 metre and a surface area of 4.38 km^{2}.
