= Ilse Dörffeldt =

German sprinter

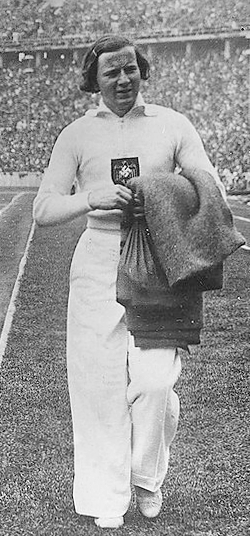
- Dörffeldt at the 1936 Olympics

Personal information
- Born: 23 March 1912 Berlin, Germany
- Died: 14 September 1992 (aged 80) Hellersdorf, Berlin, Germany
- Height: 161 cm (5 ft 3 in)
- Weight: 58 kg (128 lb)

Sport
- Sport: Athletics
- Event(s): 100 m, 200 m, 800 m
- Club: SC Charlottenburg, Berlin

Achievements and titles
- Personal best(s): 100 m – 12.1 (1933); 200 m – 25.1 (1934); 800 m – 2:21.2 (1938)

Ilse Dörffeldt (23 March 1912 – 14 September 1992) was a German sprinter who competed at the 1936 Berlin Olympics. Her 4 × 100 m team set a world record in the semifinals and led the final until a missed exchange in the final leg. She was part of the German teams that set 4 × 200 m relay world records in 1938 and 1940. After retiring from competitions she taught sports, history and German language in Banzendorf and later in East Berlin.
