= Jemiołów =

- Village
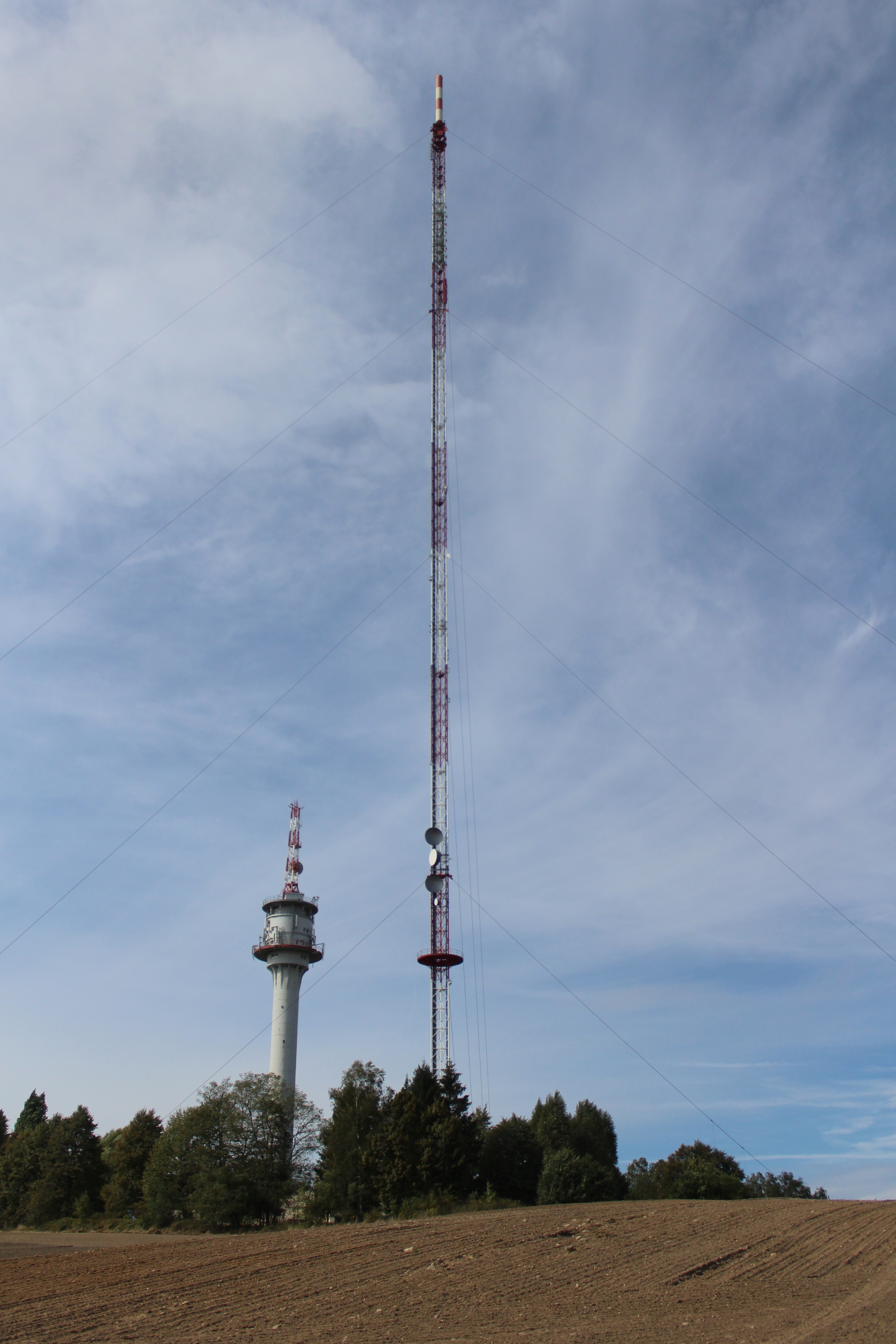

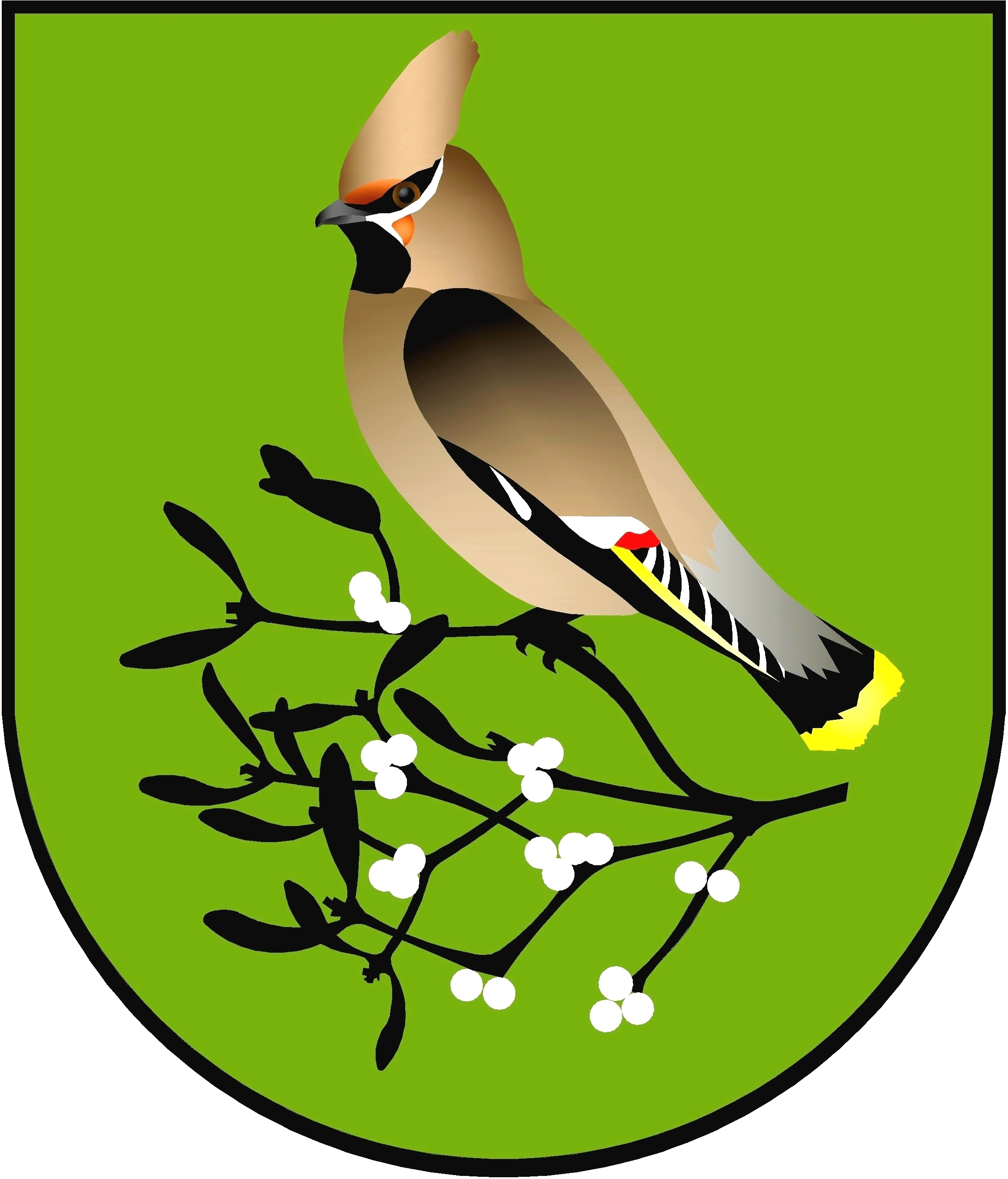
- Coat of arms

- Location within Poland
- Coordinates: 52°21′16″N 15°16′24″E
- Country: Poland
- Voivodeship: Lubusz
- County: Świebodzin
- Gmina: Łagów

Jemiołów [jɛˈmjɔwuf] is a village in the administrative district of Gmina Łagów, within Świebodzin County, Lubusz Voivodeship, in western Poland.

On 1 September 2001 Jemiołów and Banzendorf concluded a partnership between the two villages, signed by their mayors Stanisław Mucha and Peter Wilbers in Banzendorf.
