= Lindow (Mark) =

- Town
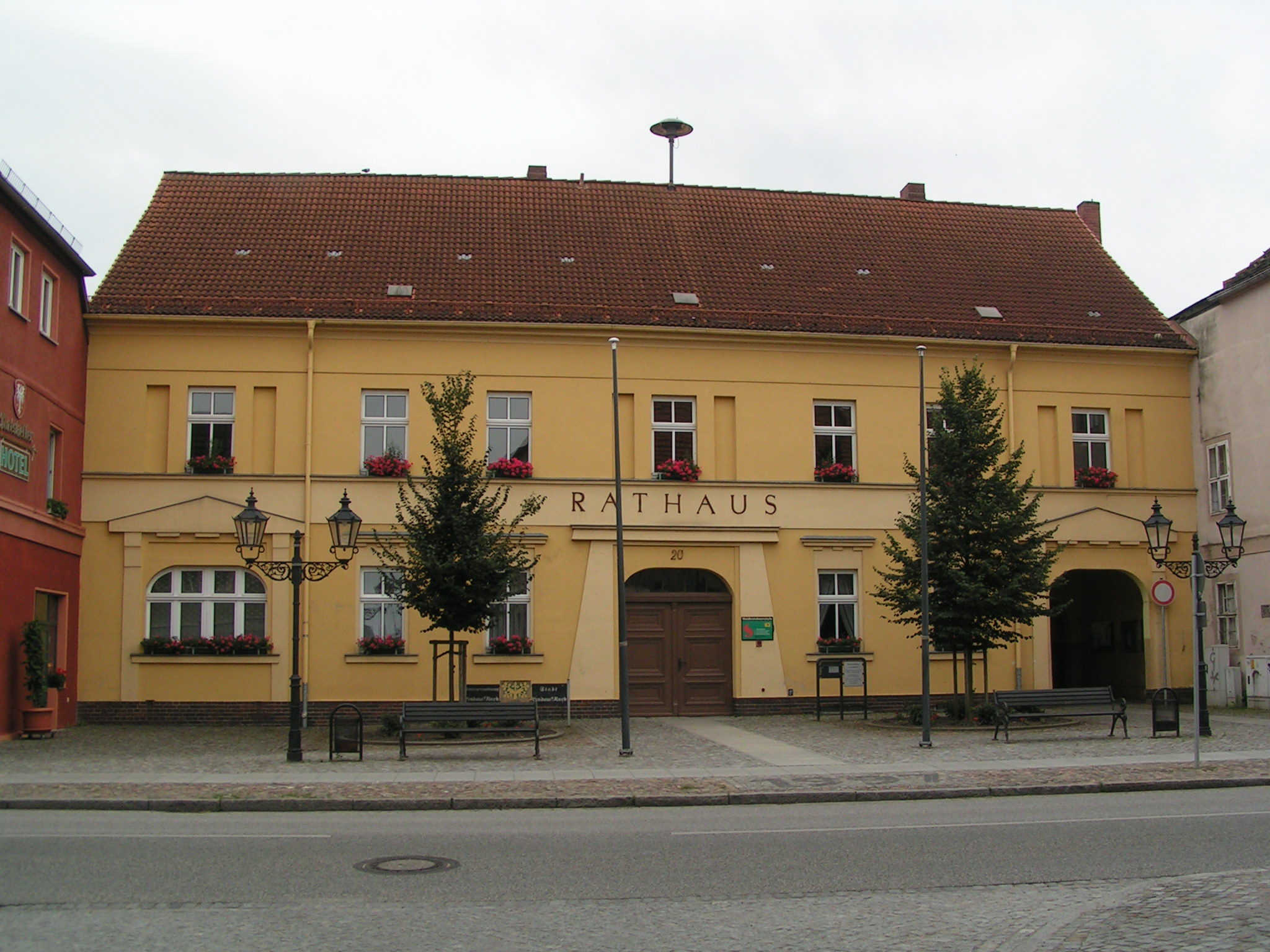
- Town hall

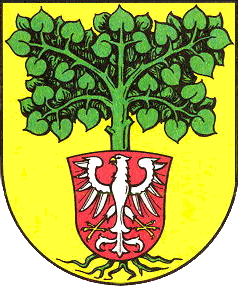
- Coat of arms

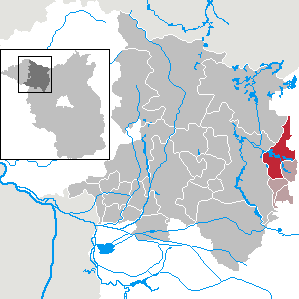
- Location of Lindow within Ostprignitz-Ruppin district
- Interactive map of Lindow
- Location within Germany Location within Brandenburg
- Coordinates: 52°58′N 12°59′E
- Country: Germany
- State: Brandenburg
- District: Ostprignitz-Ruppin
- Municipal assoc.: Lindow (Mark)
- Subdivisions: 6 Ortsteile

Government
  - Mayor (2024–29): Udo Rönnefahrt

Area
  - Total: 65.47 km^{2} (25.28 sq mi)
- Elevation: 41 m (135 ft)

Population (2025-12-31)
  - Total: 2,931
  - Density: 44.77/km^{2} (116.0/sq mi)
- Time zone: UTC+01:00 (CET)
  - Summer (DST): UTC+02:00 (CEST)
- Postal codes: 16835
- Dialling codes: 033933
- Vehicle registration: OPR
- Website: www.lindow-mark.de

Lindow (Mark) (German pronunciation: [ˈlɪndoː]) is a town in the Ostprignitz-Ruppin district, in Brandenburg, Germany. It is located 14 km northeast of Neuruppin, and 29 km northwest of Oranienburg. The town is situated on an isthmus between the lakes Gudelacksee and Wutzsee.

== History ==
In the course of the medieval eastward migrations of Germans Gebhard I, Count of Arnstein conquered the area around today's Lindow. In 1196 he settled in the castle of Ruppin, located in today's Alt Ruppin, a locality of Neuruppin. The comital family later adopted the name counts of Lindow-Ruppin. By 1220 or 1240 the counts founded a Cistercian nunnery next to Lake Wutzsee in Lindow and richly enfeoffed it with lands and villages, whose inhabitants became serfs to the nunnery. The nunnery compound comprised a cloister surrounded by the convent buildings in the east and west, the cloister church in the north and a smaller structure on the southern side partially opening towards Wutzsee.

The nunnery's estates comprised 90,000 morgen of land, 18 villages, nine watermills and several fishponds and lakes (among others Großer Stechlinsee). The dues collected from the tenants of lands allowed to maintain 35 nuns, an abbess and a male provost, pastoring them and representing the nunnery in contracts with outsiders. In return for the endowments the nuns were committed to take care of the education of the daughters of the counts, and other regional noble families.

Next to the nunnery a settlement developed which was first named in a document of 1343. The settlement developed into a little town. In 1457 a parish church was erected for the townsfolk. With the extinction of the comital family in the male line the comital fief was reverted to the prince-electors of Brandenburg in 1524. The prince-elector confirmed the nunnery in its subfiefs, previously bestowed by the counts, in 1530. After the prince-elector adopted Lutheranism in 1539 the nunnery was secularised in 1541/1542 and its fiefs taken by the prince-elector but pawned to his creditors, who left only a narrow annual appanage for the nuns. Lindow's population adopted Lutheranism in the course of the Reformation.

The prior function of the nunnery, to provide sustenance for unmarried women mostly from local noble families, wasn't to be given up with its secularisation. So the formerly Roman Catholic nunnery turned into a Lutheran women's convent (German: das Stift, more particular: Fräuleinstift, literally damsels' foundation), with its inhabitants now called conventuals. However, the appanage was little, so only few conventuals could be maintained. The foundation became a home exclusively for unmarried daughters of noble birth. The conventuals were chaired by a domina, appointed by the prince-elector.

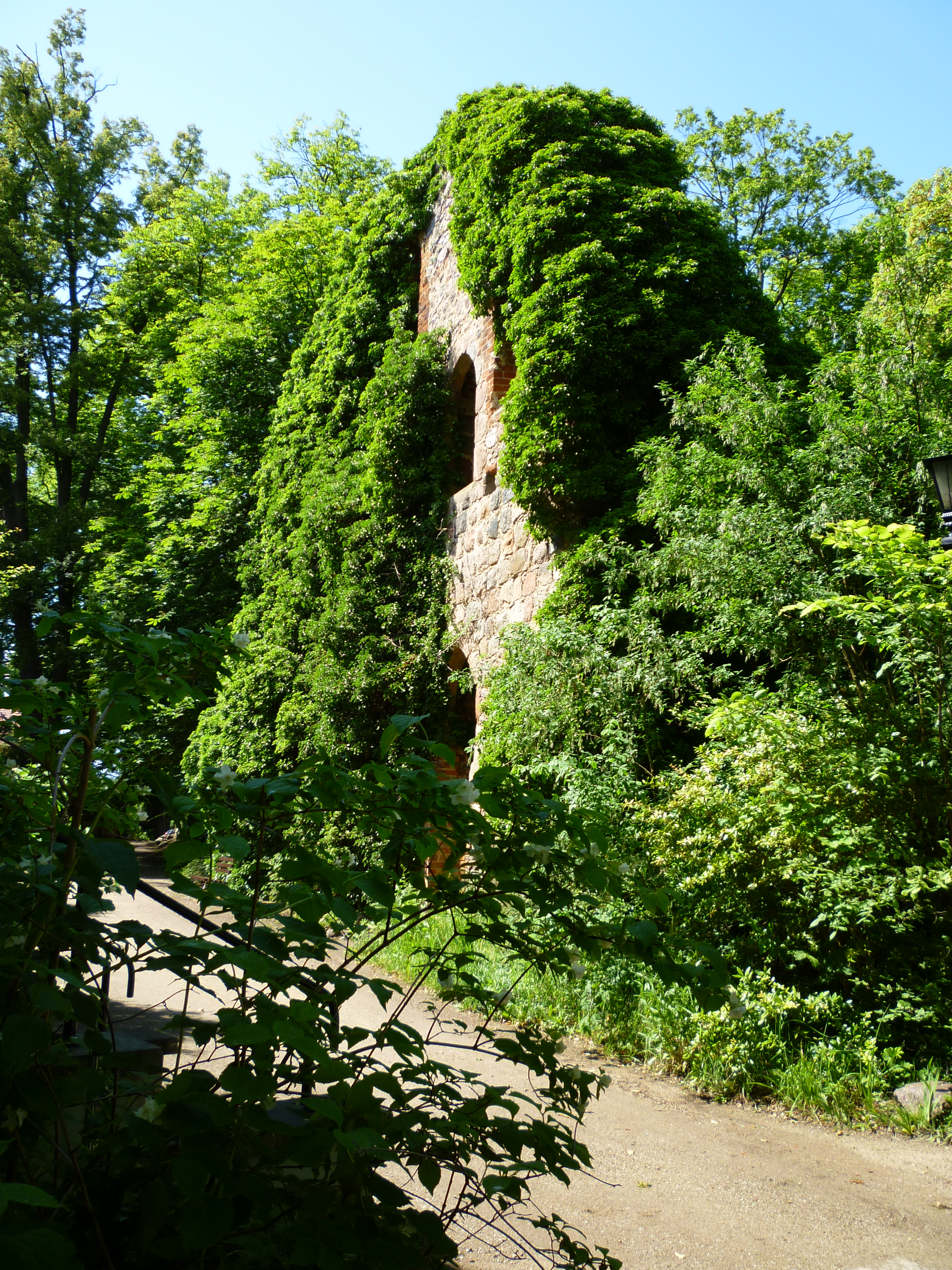
Southerly gable of the ruined convent building, erected in the 3rd quarter of the 13th century

During the Thirty Years War, Danish as well as Imperial troops captured and robbed the town in 1627, while conventuals and townsfolk weathered that on Werder island in the Gudelacksee. When in 1635 Swedish troops ravaged the town, they did not find much and crossed over to Werder island and slaughtered many townspeople.

The Imperial Army invaded and ravaged the area three years later. On 18 October 1638, the forces of General Matthias Gallas robbed and burnt the Lutheran convent, the following day they robbed and burnt the whole town of Lindow to the ground. The convent's library and the archives were destroyed by fire, the cloister school, built in the late 15th century, survived and is preserved until today. 28 further villages in the area were ravaged and burnt. Many of the survivors fled the area in order to find a survival elsewhere. Most buildings of the nunnery are in ruins since.

Until 1644 one building of the convent was restored to house the surviving remaining 12 conventuals. The decrease of dues collected from the impoverished tenants forced to reduce the number of conventuals to a mere five.

Map of Lindow (1799)

In the course of the repopulation policy of the Great Elector Frederick William I of Brandenburg the depopulated town was settled with Reformed (Calvinist) refugees from the Electorate of the Palatinate and Reformed immigrants from Switzerland between 1685 and 1691. A Reformed congregation, besides the existing belittled Lutheran, was established and Lindow used to be headed by two burgomasters at a time, one of each denomination. The convent was reestablished as Hochadeliges Fräuleinstift (High and Noble Damsels' Foundation) in 1696.

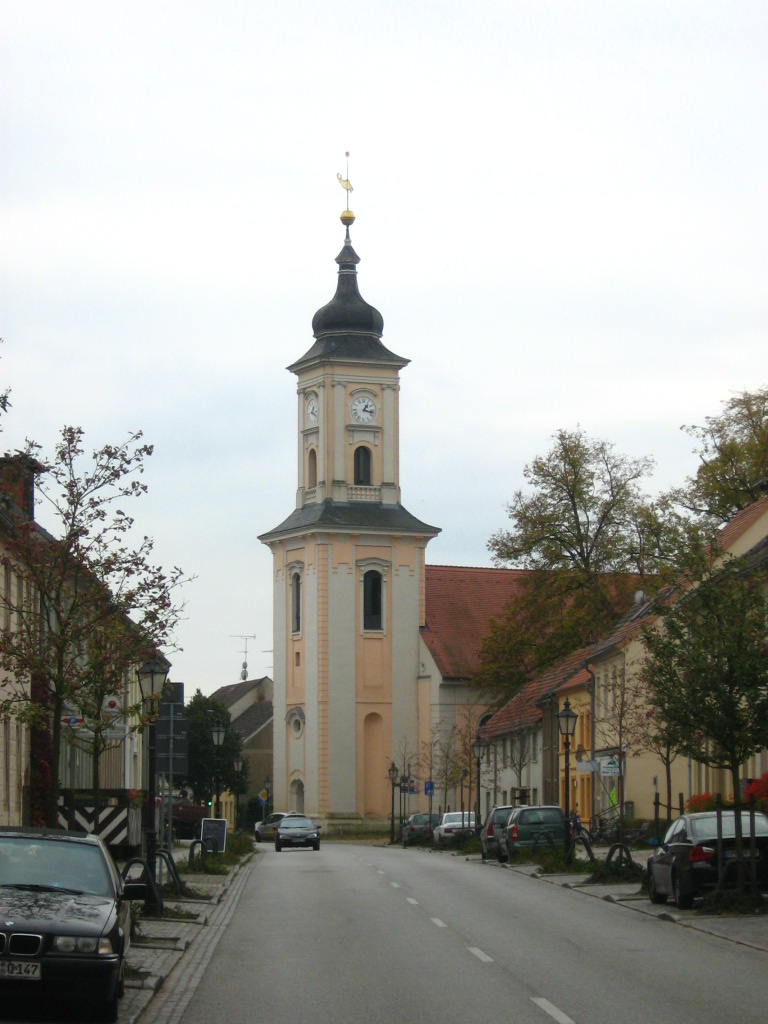
Lutheran Town Church

In 1746 a city fire burnt most of Lindow to ashes. Today's Town Church (Stadtkirche) at the southern end of the old town, was reerected in baroque style as the Lutheran church between 1751 and 1755 by the architect Georg Christoph Berger. It shows an altarpiece "Noli me tangere" by Heinrich Stadler of 1771 depicting the resurrected Jesus of Nazareth appearing to Mary Magdalene. The matroneum opposite to the pulpit altar is still occasionally called the damsels' gallery (Fräuleinempore), where the conventuals used to sit during services. The typical Protestant pulpit altar has a sand glass fixed on its parapet, donated by the congregation to a pastor in the 18th century in view of lengthy preaches in order to restrain them. In 1752 the then Domina Ilse von Rochow erected on her expenses a new dominate building. Rochow reachieved some autonomy for the conventuals who were electing their chairing domina since, restricting the throne to a mere confirmation of the elect. The number of conventuals rose again.

The Reformed church stood in the centre of the town behind the town hall. The last years of the 18th century was a flourishing time for Lindow, however, ending with another devastating city fire on 16 April 1803. After that Burgomaster Werdermann erected today's town hall in neoclassicist forms on his own expenses between 1807 and 1809. In 1810 Lindow was bestowed town privileges. In the first third of the 19th century Lindow became the seat of a Jewish congregation, which opened a cemetery in 1824 and a private synagogue, serving as a place of worship for the Jews living in diaspora in the surrounding villages. The writer Theodor Fontane visited Lindow several times and described it in his writings. The rural exodus made many people move to the urban centres, this is why the Reformed congregation and the Jewish congregation shrank. In the early 1920s the Jewish congregation was dissolved due to lacking membership.

The convent, was modernised in its constitution and stabilised in its revenues by 1875, named Landesherrliches Fräuleinstift Kloster Lindow (sovereign Damsel's foundation of Lindow monastery) since. Conveyances of interest bearing assets allowed again to maintain eleven conventuals. The Reformed church was so dilapidated that it had to be closed in 1842, it was finally torn down in 1879. The Lutheran Town Church then served as a Lutheran-Reformed simultaneum until the two congregations merged in a united congregation in 1922. Since 1859 a Catholic mission existed which resulted in the foundation of a Catholic congregation by 1926 and the erection of St. Joseph Chapel between 1931 and 1932 in moderate forms of Brick Expressionism.

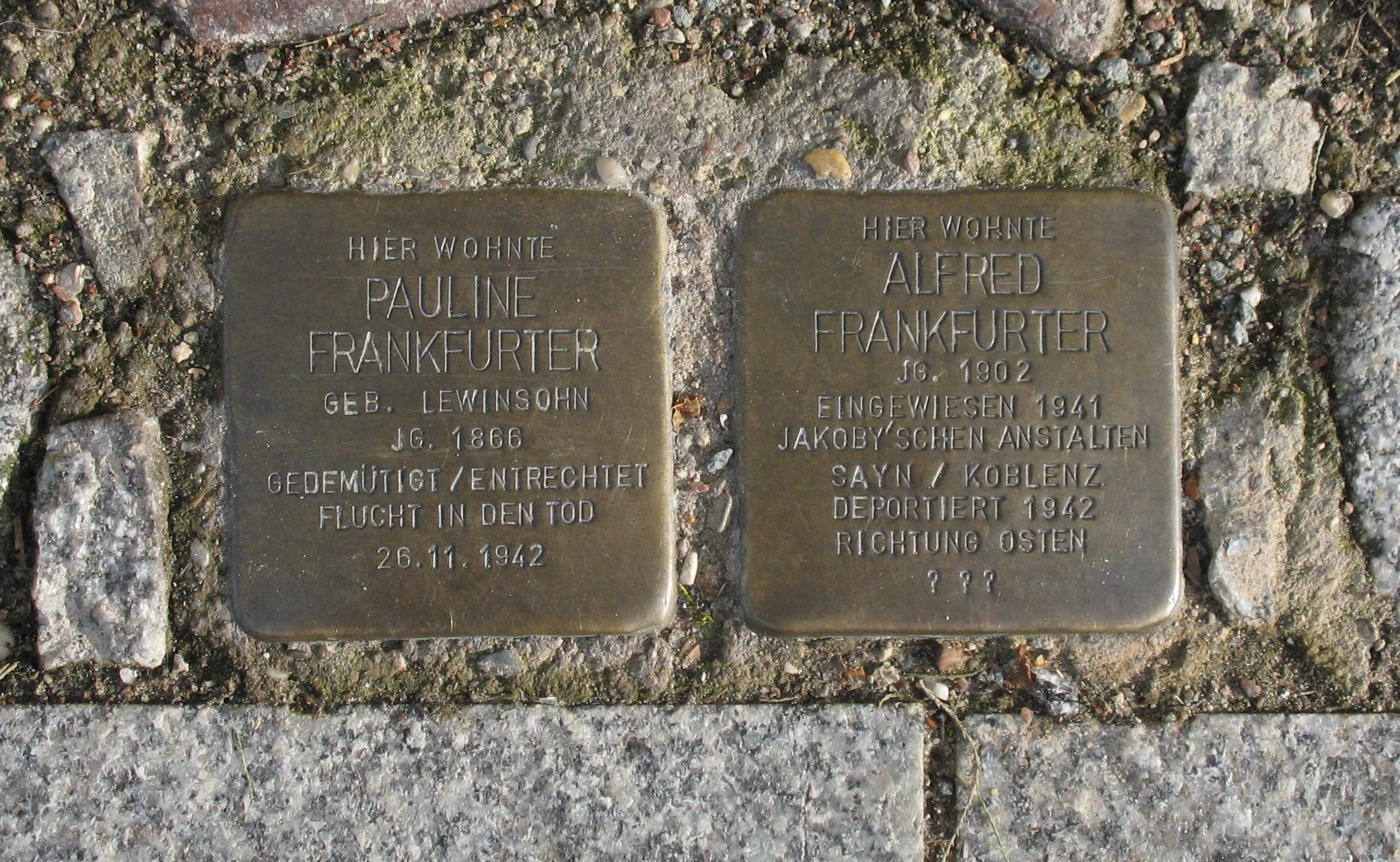
"Stumbling blocks"

From 1815 to 1945, Lindow was part of the Prussian Province of Brandenburg. Lindow lived through the changes after the First World War and the takeover by the Nazis in 1933. Between September 1937 and the end of 1944 the SS organisation Lebensborn ran the home Kurmark in Klosterheide, a component village of Lindow north of the town. The widow of the Music Professor Zeidler was deported to Theresienstadt after her husband's death in 1942 and perished there. She was a Protestant of Jewish descent, and lost her previous precarious protected status of a so-called privileged mixed marriage when her husband died.

After the Second World War Lindow became part of the Soviet Occupation Zone in Germany, which became East Germany (the German Democratic Republic) in 1945. From 1952 to 1990, Lindow was part of the Bezirk Potsdam of East Germany. The damsels' foundation became a Protestant home for elderly of all backgrounds (called Evangelisches Stift "Kloster Lindow" since), many terribly impoverished by the impacts of the war, run by deaconesses of the Lichtenrade Mother House "Salem" in West Berlin between 1947 and 1961, when the Berlin Wall disrupted this affiliation. The Evangelical Church in Berlin-Brandenburg, the regional Protestant church body of the area, converted a building in the nunnery compound on Wutzsee as its conference venue (Evangelische Akademie). However, communist East Germany, with its censorship and repression of free conventions, forbade the opening of the venue.

In the 1980s a local initiative renovated the enclosure walls and headstones of the Jewish cemetery, which had weathered the Nazi period untouched. In 1989, the Town Church became a venue for people demanding change in East Germany. In March 1990 the dismissed East German head of state Erich Honecker retired for two nights in the manor house of Gühlen, used as guest house of the Council of Ministers of the GDR, however, leaving after protests by people from Lindow. Since 3 October 1990 Lindow is a part of the Federal Republic of Germany. Many traditional productions sharply reduced their staffs, while tourism became a stronger business. The German demographic crisis is also felt in Lindow, here combined with the migration of many younger to more prosperous areas. Evangelisches Stift "Kloster Lindow" was extended by modern premises between 1998 and 2000.

== Demography ==
Development of Population since 1875 within the Current Boundaries (Blue Line: Population; Dotted Line: Comparison to Population Development of Brandenburg state; Grey Background: Time of Nazi rule; Red Background: Time of Communist rule)

Lindow (Mark): Population development
within the current boundaries (2013)

Year	Pop.	±% p.a.
1875	3,134	—
1890	3,059	−0.16%
1910	2,777	−0.48%
1925	3,117	+0.77%
1933	3,298	+0.71%
1939	3,532	+1.15%
1946	5,476	+6.46%
1950	4,702	−3.74%
1964	3,829	−1.46%
1971	4,047	+0.79%
1981	3,834	−0.54%
1985	3,798	−0.24%
1989	3,712	−0.57%
1990	3,636	−2.05%
1991	3,530	−2.92%
1992	3,505	−0.71%
1993	3,464	−1.17%
1994	3,482	+0.52%
1995	3,467	−0.43%
1996	3,470	+0.09%

Year	Pop.	±% p.a.
1997	3,455	−0.43%
1998	3,502	+1.36%
1999	3,525	+0.66%
2000	3,516	−0.26%
2001	3,485	−0.88%
2002	3,436	−1.41%
2003	3,386	−1.46%
2004	3,309	−2.27%
2005	3,276	−1.00%
2006	3,243	−1.01%
2007	3,194	−1.51%
2008	3,159	−1.10%
2009	3,102	−1.80%
2010	3,097	−0.16%
2011	3,075	−0.71%
2012	3,047	−0.91%
2013	3,038	−0.30%
2014	2,991	−1.55%
2015	2,966	−0.84%
2016	3,028	+2.09%

== Components of Lindow ==
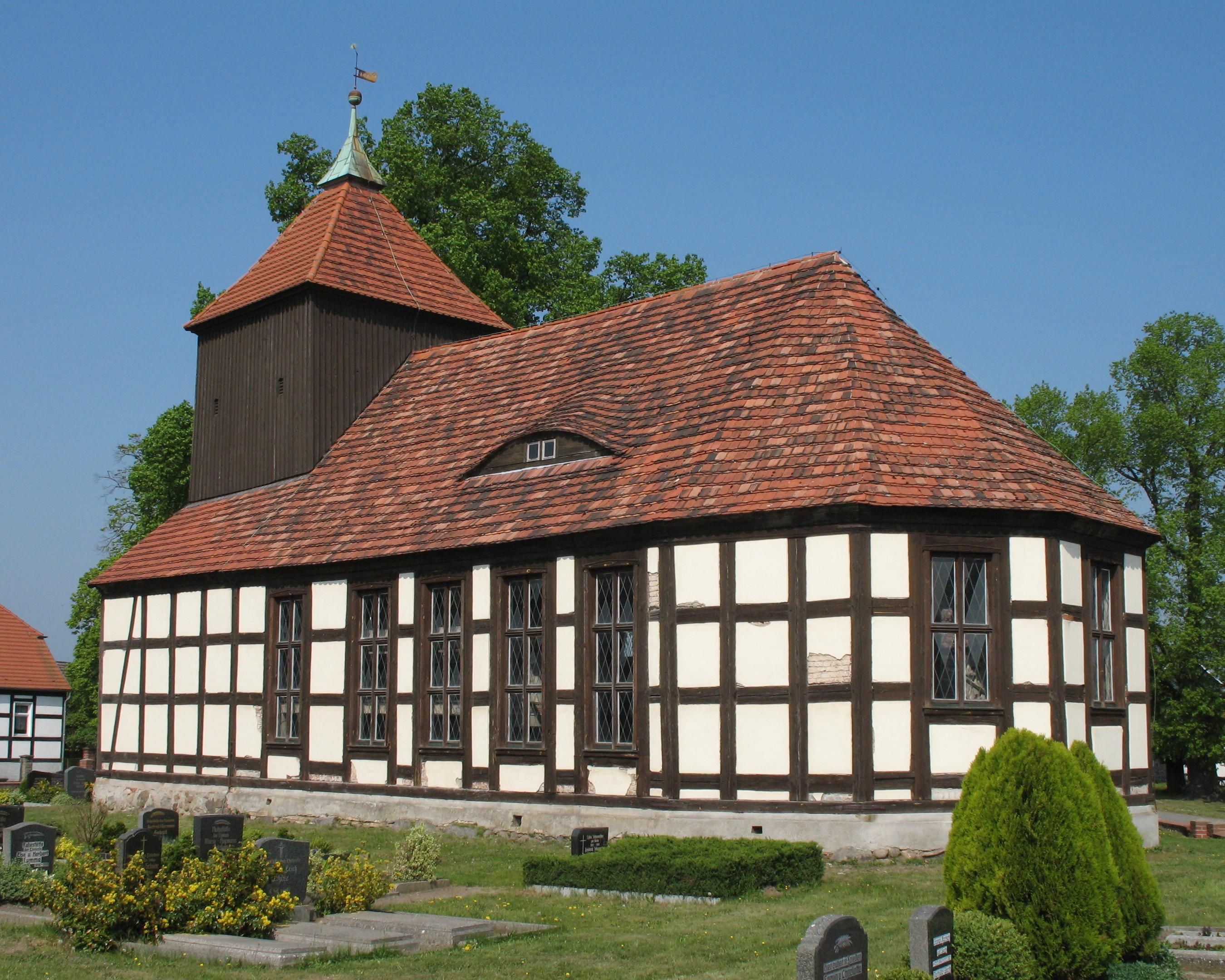
Protestant Church, built in 1689, in Schönberg in der Mark, a component of Lindow

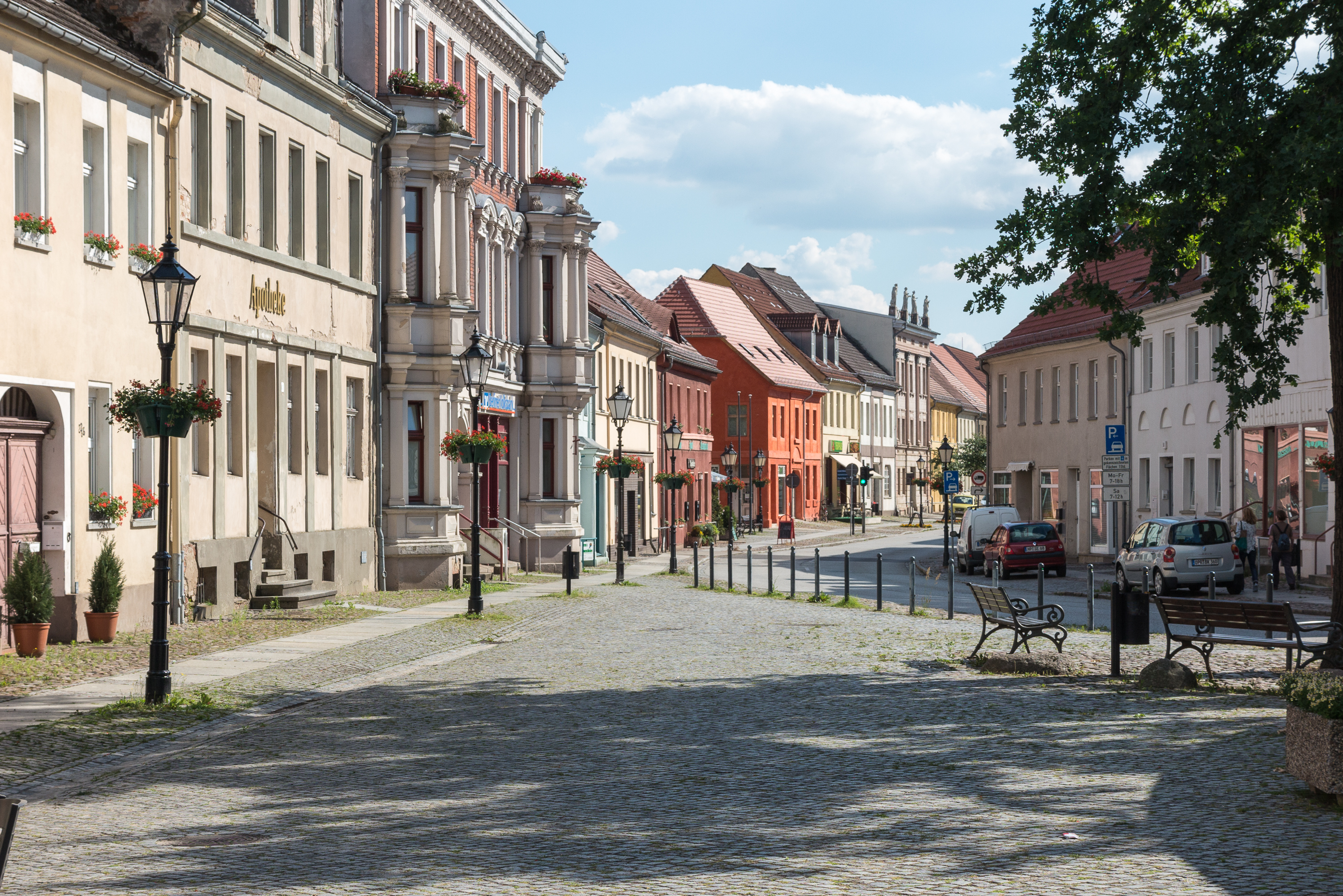
Lindow (Mark), Market Square

Today's Lindow comprises the formerly independent municipalities of:

- Banzendorf (a former outlying estate of the nunnery)
- Hindenberg
- Keller bei Gransee
- Klosterheide (literally monastery/cloister heath; a former outlying estate, Vorwerk, of the nunnery)
- Schönberg in der Mark/Schönberg (Mark)

Further there are the following localities:

- Birkenfelde
- Dampfmühle
- Grünhof
- Gühlen
- Kramnitz
- Kramnitzmühle
- Rosenhof
- Rudershof
- Siedlung Werbellinsee
- Sportschule Lindow
- Wilhelmshöhe (erected as lung sanatorium in 1913 by Rohde & Beschoren in a generous palace-like style)
