= Flurzwang =

German term compulsory field rotation

Flurzwang is the German term for a farmer's obligation to participate in compulsory prescribed crop rotations, a practice prevalent in Europe from the 13th – 19th centuries, though the practice dates back much farther. Flurzwang was practiced across central Europe, though it persisted for the longest in regions which are now Germany, with much sparser records of Flurzwang in the alpine regions to the south. Under this system, the owners of farmland, the lord of the manor, or, in many cases, a communal committee ordered the cultivation of agricultural land in the community using a three year crop rotation system – i.e., each piece of land was divided into three parcels; one for winter grains, one for summer grains, and one to be kept fallow for the grazing of livestock. It typically resulted in dispersal of the ownership of property over the entire land of the community, the so-called Gemengelage (mixed location).

== Objective ==
The aim was to prevent a farmer or property owner from gaining an advantage by harvesting earlier or cultivating other produce from what had previously been agreed upon. These agreements were also supposed to prevent damages to crops from people walking or driving carts onto the fields due to differing harvest times of various crops. In addition, they were to prevent theft of vegetables or other produce. As part of Flurzwang, land owners had to relinquish part of their land for pathways when the land was developed. Fenced fields were exempted from Flurzwang and special crops could also be grown on them. This was the case for wine growing, for instance. The owner of such a field had to pay compensation to the other farmers.

== Obligations ==
Each farmer had to obey the agreed upon sequence for the crops in the crop rotation system and also the agreed upon times for the work (plowing, sowing and harvesting). Otherwise, it would have been necessary for a farmer to drive his wagon over neighboring fields to reach his own fields. No one could disobey these rules. The chairman of a farmers cooperative or of a village who was in charge of the Flurzwang was called Schulze.

== End of Flurzwang ==
The Flurzwang system was highly inefficient, largely because some parcels of land were simply not suited for certain crops. In the 18th century, fallow land began being rotated through root vegetable (e.g., potatoes and beets) planting, with clover planted every 6th year. Around this time, the practice of Flurzwang was also targeted by government agricultural reforms following a series of famines. It was finally abolished during the liberation of the farmers, which happened in Germany, Switzerland and Austria as a result of the French Revolution from approximately 1803 to 1850.
