= Rogert Møller =

Danish architect and politician (1844–1918)

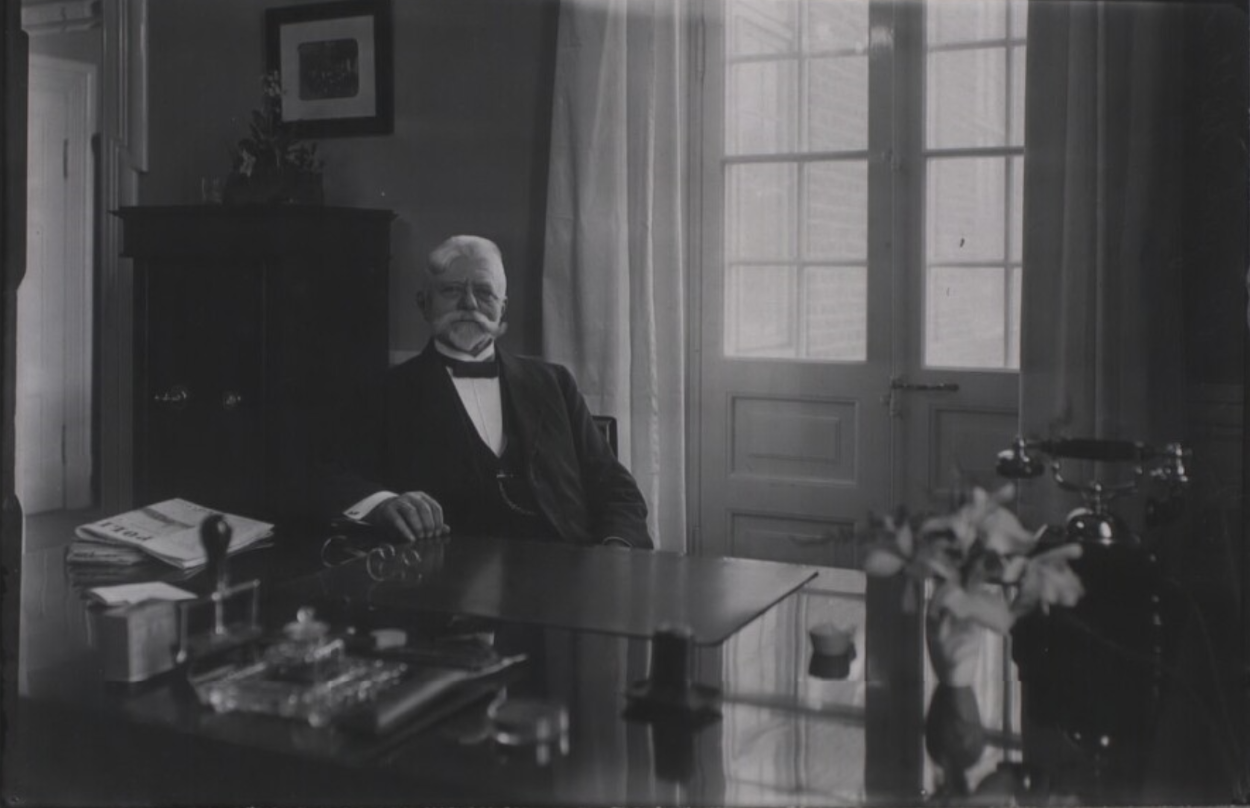
- Rogert Møller behind his desk photographed by Holger Damgaard
- Born: 6 December 1844; Hørsholm, Denmark
- Died: 27 July 1918 (aged 73); Copenhagen, Denmark
- Occupations: Architect; credit union manager
- Awards: Knight of the Dannebrog

Rogert Møller (6 December 1844 – 26 August 1918) was a Danish architect and credit union manager. He was as an architect mainly active in the Vesterbro district of Copenhagen, designing many residential buildings during the population boom of the late 19th century. He worked for Østifternes Kreditforening from 1876 and served as chief technical officer from 1904.

== Early life and career ==
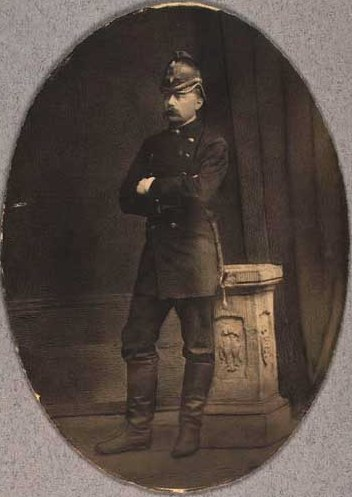
Rogert Møller

Møller was born on 6 December 1844 in Hørsholm, the son of merchant and later innkeeper Jacob Møller (1803–1857) and Mariane Cathrine Schaltz (c. 1808–1849). His mother died when he was five years old and his father subsequently married a second time to Ernestine Wilhelmine Wegner in 1852.

Møller enrolled at the Artillery School at the age of 14 and continued his education at Elekskolen at Frederiksberg Palace. He then joined the Topographic General Staff's Department as an aspirant and was appointed as a guide in 1864. He resigned from the position in 1870 to assume a position as an assistant in the Copenhagen Fire Department.

== Architecture ==
In his spare time, while working for the Copenhagen Fire Department, Møller started to work as a draughtsman. He was later also charged with building design and established his own architectural practice in 1991. Despite his lack of formal education at the art academy, he was responsible for the design of an extensive number of residential buildings, particularly in Vesterbro but also in other emerging districts.

== Work for Østifternes Kreditforening ==
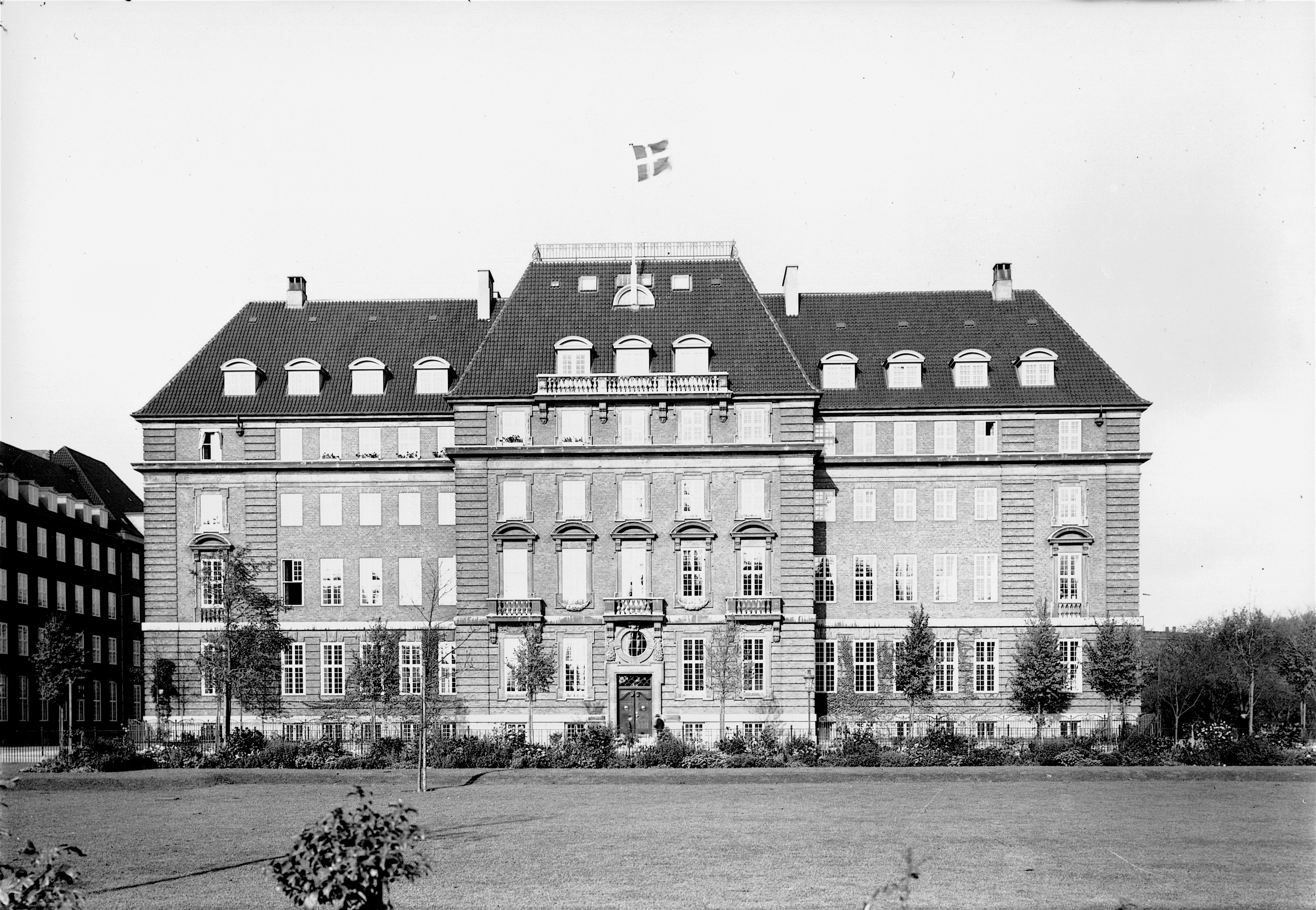
Østifternes Kreditforening

Møller's work as an architect brought him into contact with land owners and through them the Østifternes Kreditforening ('Islands' Credit Union') with whom he soon started a more formalized collaboration. He started out as an assessor in 1875, became a member of the board of representatives in 1877, became an auditor (revisor) in 1879, and finally chief technical officer (bygningskyndig direktør) in 1904. He took an active part in the planning and realisation of the union's new headquarters at Jarmers Plads in 1913–1914.

== Politics and public offices ==
Møller was a member of the Copenhagen City Council from 1892 to 1898, where he belonged to the Conservative group. He was chairman of the Vesterbro Landowners' Association from 1885 to 1904.

== Personal life ==
Møller married twice. His first wife was Emilie Christine Marie Witt (22 June 1846 – 9 October 1894), daughter of steward Hans Thomas Frederik Witt (1818–1910) and Sophie Louise Andersen (1818–1853). They were married on 8 December 1869 in the Garrison Church in Copenhagen. His second wife was Sophie Cathinka Wilhelmine Knuppert (23 July 1854 – 6 December 1938), daughter of credit union managing director Frederik Louis Carl K. (1827–1884) and Marie Elisabeth Jørgensen (1827–1884). They were married on 18 September 1895.

Møller was awarded the title of justitsråd in 1901 and etatsråd in 1908. He was made a Knight in the Order of the Dannebrog in 1898 and was awarded the Cross of Honour in 1914. He died on 26 August 1918 and is buried at Vestre Cemetery.

== Selected works ==
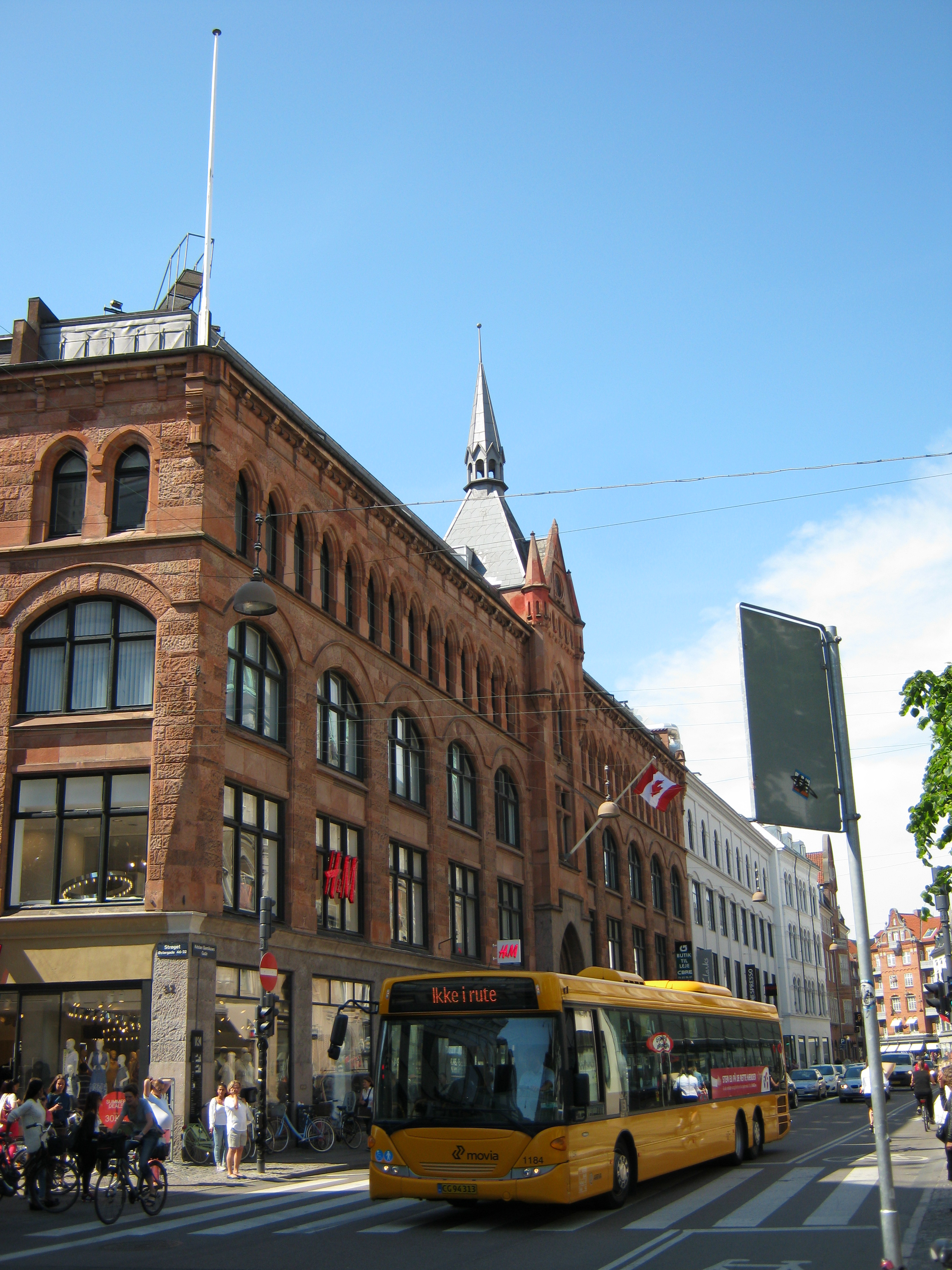
Volmerhus, now Galleri K

- Værnedamsvej 4A, Frederiksberg (1876)
- Courtyard church building, Blågårdsgade 40, Nørrebro (1878–1879)
- Gammel Kongevej 33B, Frederiksberg (1876)
- Gammel Kongevej 33A, Frederiksberg (1878–1881)
- Viktoriagade 12, Vesterbro (1881)
- Istedgade 42, Vesterbro (1881)
- Gasværksvej 12, Vesterbro (1882–1883)
- Bagerstræde 1/Vesterbrogade 50, Vesterbro (1884–1885)
- Eriksgade 12–14, Vesterbro (1886–1887)
- Abel Cathrines Gade 8–10 (1886–1887)
- Abel Cathrines Gade 12 (1886–1887)
- Abel Cathrines Gade 14–16/Istedgade (1886–1887)
- Gasværksvej 26/Eriksgade 1, Vesterbro (1887–1888)
- Eriksgade 3–5, Vesterbro (1887–1888)
- Åboulevard 21, Frederiksberg (1888)
- Vesterbrogade 30/Stenosgade 1, Vesterbro (1894–1895)
- Cityhus, Pilestræde 14, City Centre (1897–1898)
- Vester Voldgade 25, Vesterbro (1898)
- Vesterbrogade 119, Vesterbro (1898–1899)
- Købmagergade 63–65, City Centre (1898–1899)
- Upsalahus, Upsalagade/Lundsgade, Østerbro (1899)
- Volmerhus, Kristen Bernikows Gade 1/Østergade 32/Antonigade, City Centre (1902)
- Vesterbrogade 20, Vesterbro (1901–1903)
- Vesterbrogade 69–71, Vesterbro (1906–1907)
- Forhåbningsholms Allé 23, Frederiksberg (1905)
- Jacobys Allé 6–8, Frederiksberg (1908)

=== In collaboration with Erik Schiødt ===
- Aladdin Complex (three blocks), Overgaden oven Vandet/Andreas Bjørns Gade/Burmeistergade/Brobergsgade/Prinsessegade, Christianshavn (1899–1901)

=== In collaboration with Valdemar Dan ===
- Kronborg, Gåsegade 2/Farvergade 15/Vandkunsten 12/Løngangsstræde 16, Copenhagen (1894–1895 and 1908–1910)
- Vesterbrogade 35, Copenhagen (1903–1905, facade altered in 1954)
- Farvergade 6–8, Copenhagen (1907)
- Husligt Arbejder Forbund, Farvergade 10–12/Rådhuspladsen 77, Copenhagen (1908, renovated 1983)
