= Antonigade 3 =

Building in Copenhagen, Denmark

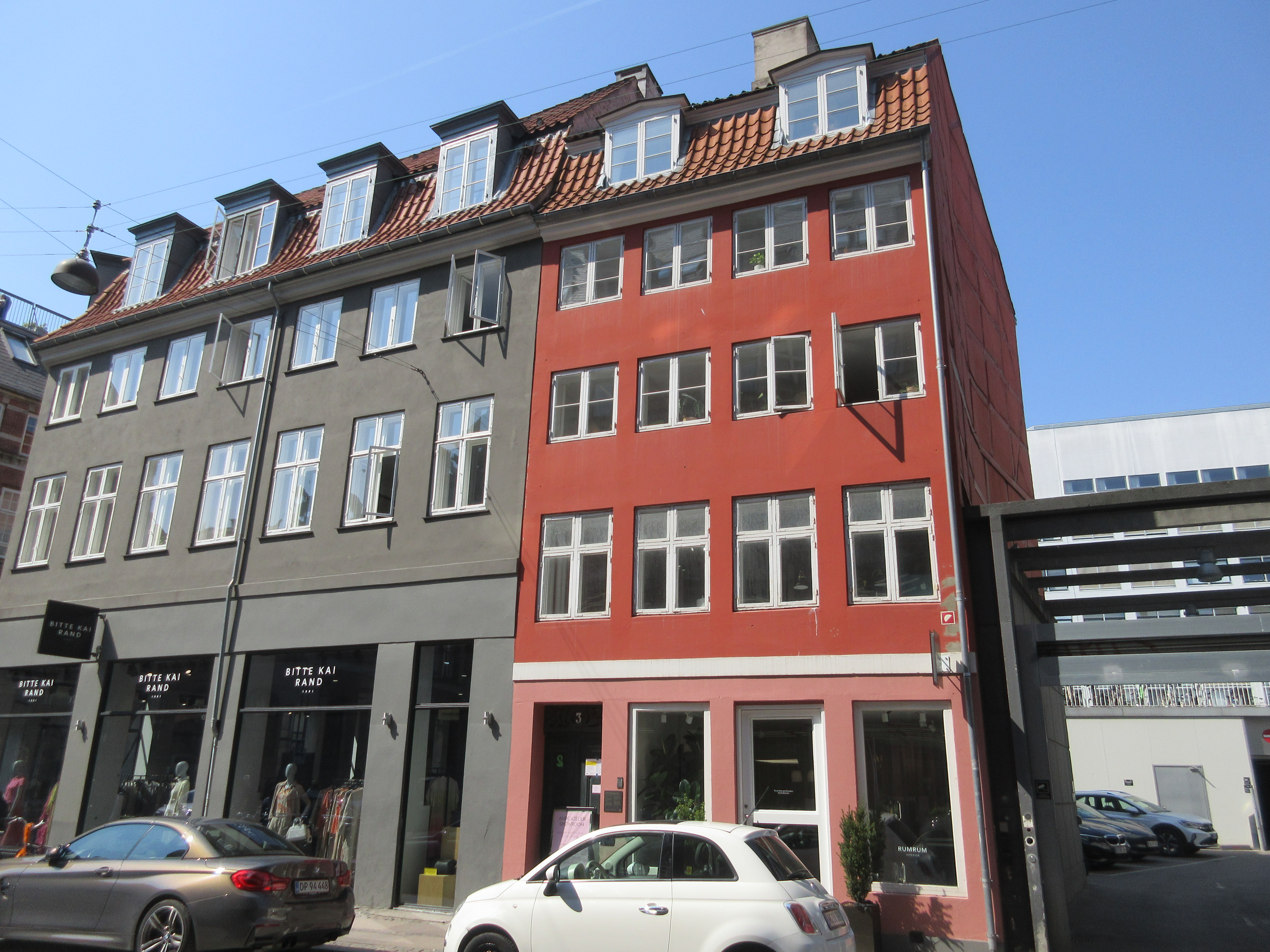
- Interactive map of the Antonigade 3 area

General information
- Location: Copenhagen, Denmark
- Coordinates: 55°40′49.3″N 12°34′51.49″E
- Completed: 18th century

Antonigade 3 is a historic property in the Old Town of Copenhagen, Denmark. It was listed in the Danish registry of protected buildings and places in 1986.

== History ==
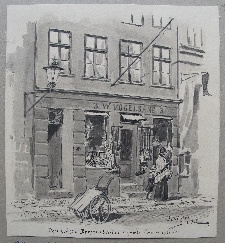
W. Vogelsang's property on a drawing by J. L. Ridter, 1900

A two-storey, half-timbered building at the site was in 1712-1713 heightened by one floor and the fourth floor was added some time between 1733 and 1799.

Antonigade was for many years colloquially known as Børstenbinderstræde due to the many brushmakers that were based in the street. No. 3 was in 1900 owned by brushmaker W. Vogelsang.

The building was listed in the Danish registry of protected buildings and places in 1986.

== Architecture ==
The building consists of four floors and is topped by a mansard roof. The ground floor is constructed in brick while the rear side and gables of the upper floors are constructed with timber framing. The timber framing of the east gable has been exposed since the building at No. 5 was demolished in the years after World War II.
