= Peter Leonhard Gianelli =

Danish medallist (1767–1807)

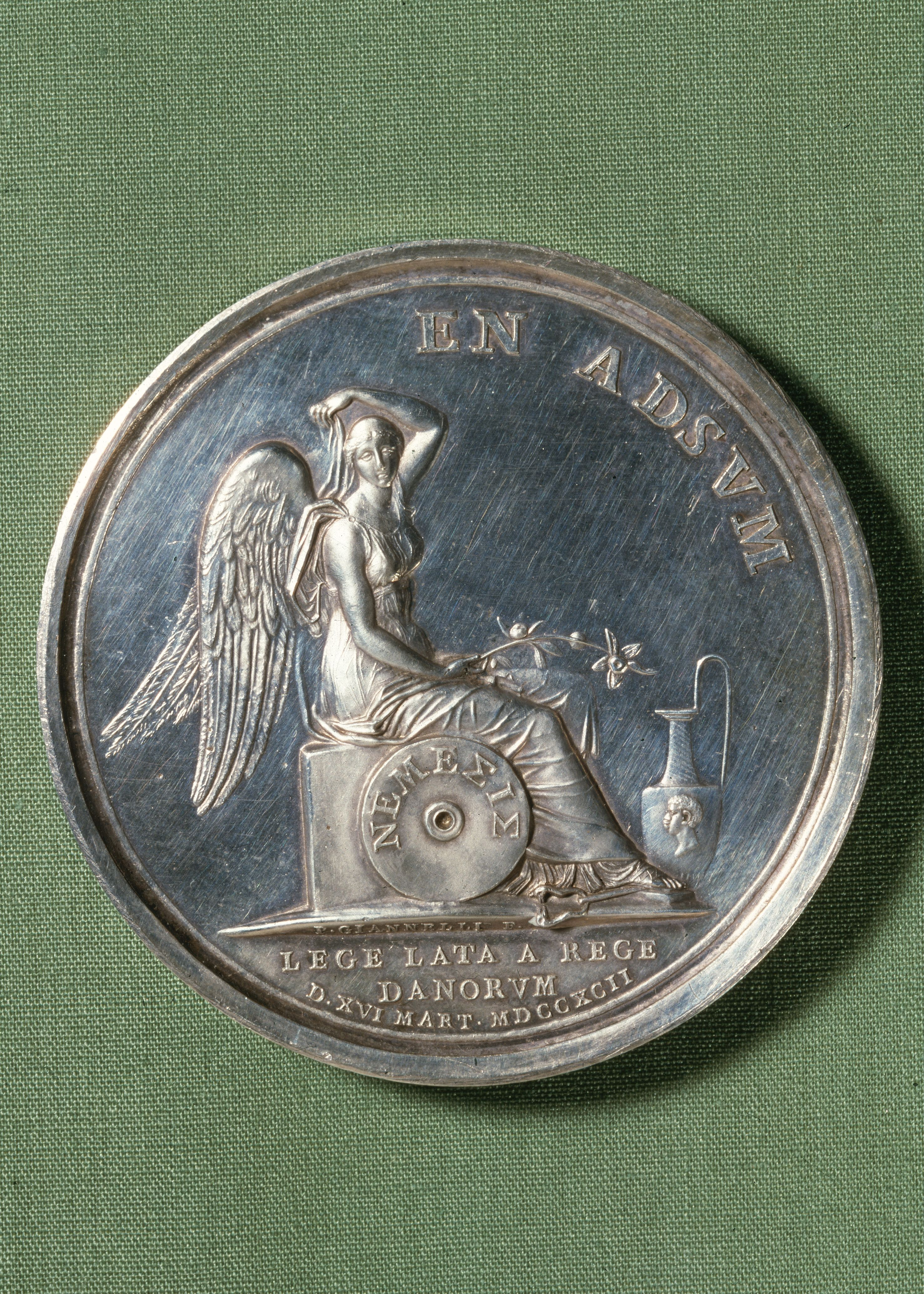
Front side of the Danish Abolition of the Slave Trade Medal

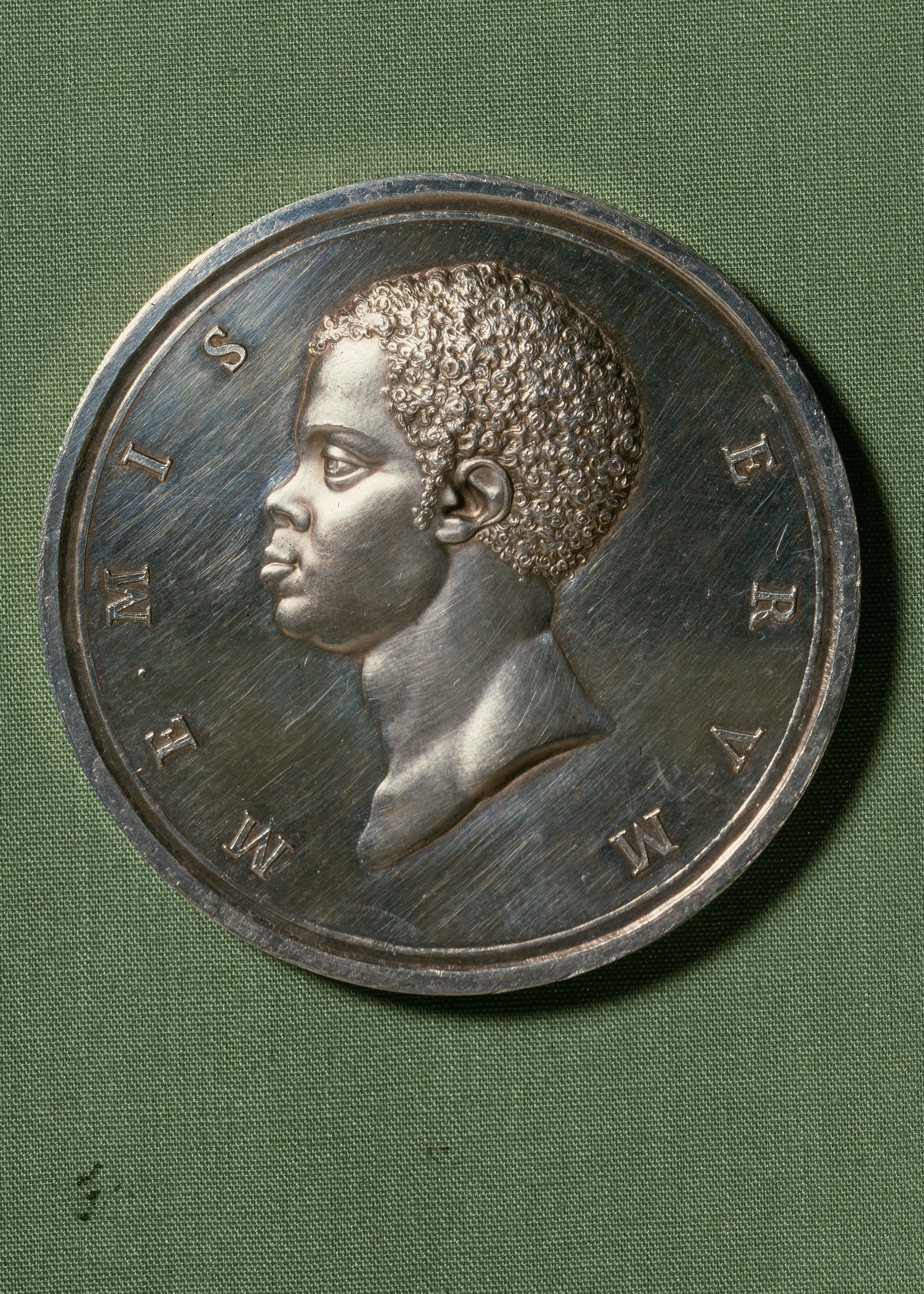
Reverse side of the Danish Abolition of the Slave Trade Medal

Peter Leonhard (Pietro Leonardo) Gianelli (27 December 1767 – 23 December 1807) was a Danish medallist and sculptor. His most notable works include two medels commemorating the Danish Abolition of the Slave Trade (1792) and the Battle of Copenhagen (1801), both of which were based on drawings by Nicolai Abraham Abildgaard.

== Early life and education ==
Gianelli was born on 27 December 1767 in Copenhagen, the son of plasterer Domenico Maria Gianelli (c. 1723–1801) and Johanna Eisen (1743–1812). His father had come to Denmark in 1758 and was married to Maria Barbra (c. 1735–1759) in his first marriage. The family resided at Østergade 133 in Copenhagen.

Gianelli attended the Royal Danish Academy of Fine Arts from 1778 to 1791. He was initially trained as a sculptor, winning the small and large silver medals in 1784 and 1787 and finally the small gold medal in 1789. He then decided to specialize as a medallist. Nicolai Abraham Abildgaard saw to it that he was awarded the Academy's travel stipend in 1791 in spite of not having won its large gold medal. He spent the next five years abroad.

== Career ==
On his return to Copenhagen in 1796, he was associated the Academy. In 1798, he was made a full member of the Academy after submitting a new stamp for the Academy's large silver medal as his membership piece. In 1800, he was engaged as medallist at the Royal Mint.

Gianelli's early works as a sculptor include a statue of Apollo (1787) and a relief of Cain and Abel (1789, competition work) as well as a number of portrait reliefs and busts.

As a medallist, he only created the stamps for nine medals. The most successful of them were based on drawings by Abildgaard. One of them was the Academy's new large silver medal. Two of the others commemorated the abolition of the Trans-Atlantic slave trade (1792), and the Battle of Copenhagen (1801). The fourth was the Royal Danish Academy of Science and Letters' Prize Medal. The portrait on a medal to Martin Vahl (died 1804) was also based on a drawing by Abildgaard. His other works include the stamps for a half speciedaler (1798) and spdr. (1799 and 1800) as well as kurantpengesedler and skatkammerbeviser.

== Personal life ==
On 8 March 1802 Gianelli married Anna Margrethe Louise Boyesen (1778–1851) in Holmen Church; she was the daughter of bailiff (byfoged) and kancelliråd Søren B. (1730–1798) and Dorothea Sophie Bruun (1746–1831).

Gianelli was friends with Bertel Thorvaldsen in his youth. They were both members of Borups Selskab, a private theatre society. His sister Christiane Juliane Frederikke Gianelli (1782–1816) married Christian Horneman, a painter of miniatures, in 1807. He died on 23 December 1807 and is buried in the Catholic section of Assistens Cemetery. His widow was subsequently married to his brother Giovanni Domenico Gianelli, a plasterer.

== List of works ==
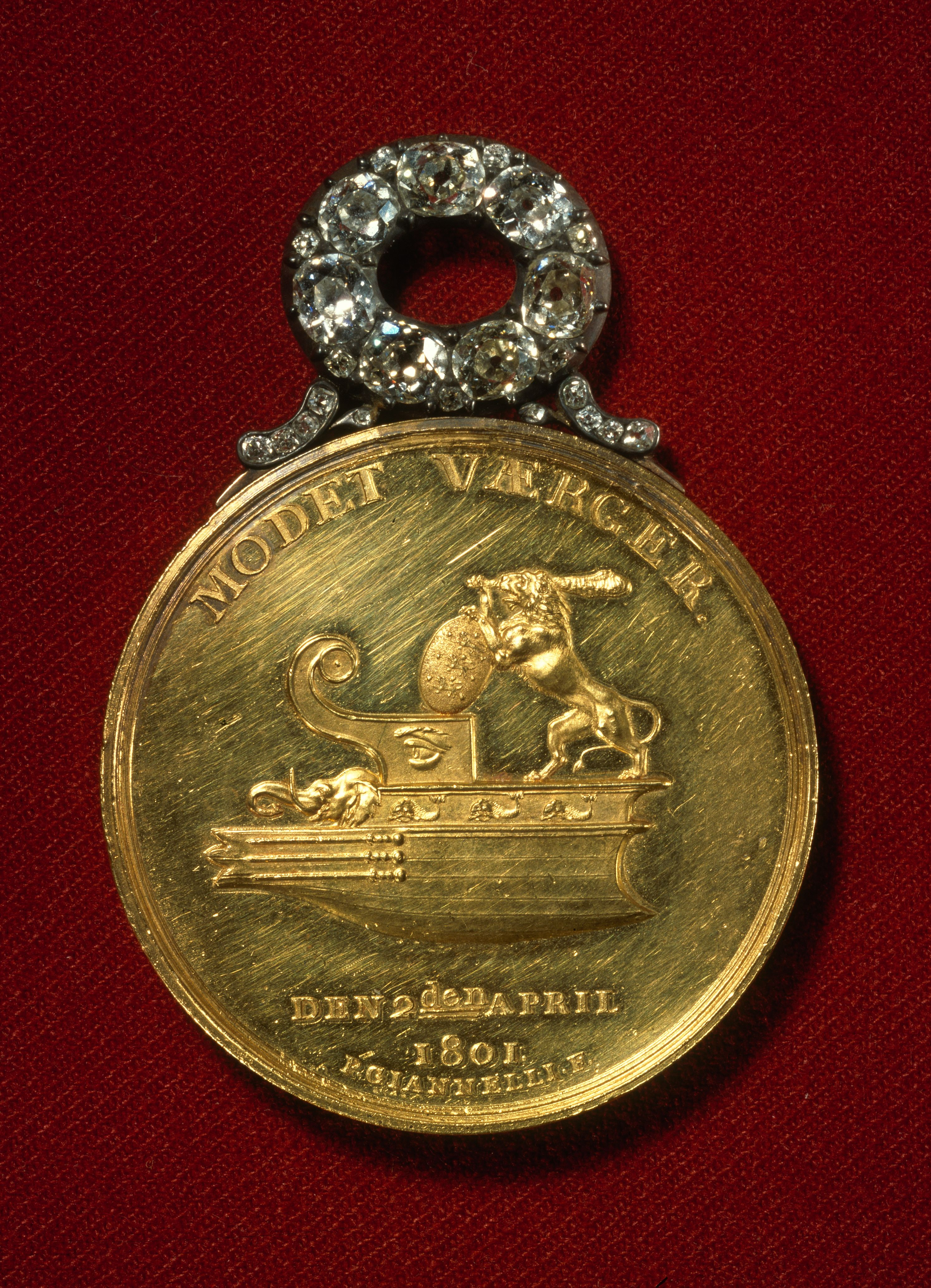
Olfert Fischer's personal example of the Medal commemorating the Battle of Copenhagen (1801), now in the National Museum of Denmark.

Medals

- Danish Abolition of the Slave Trade Medal (1792)
- Medal commemorating the Battle of Copenhagen (1801)

Statues

- Apollo (1787)

Reliefs

- Kain and Abel (17789)
- H. W. v.Huth (1783, Frederiksborg Museum)
- Ove Høegh-Guldberg (1784, Frederiksborg Museum)

Busts

- Balth. Münter (1789, Copenhagen University Library)
- J. C. J. v.Berger (1791, Frederiksborg Museum)
