= Christian Barnekow (1556–1612) =

16th Century Danish Nobleman and Diplomat

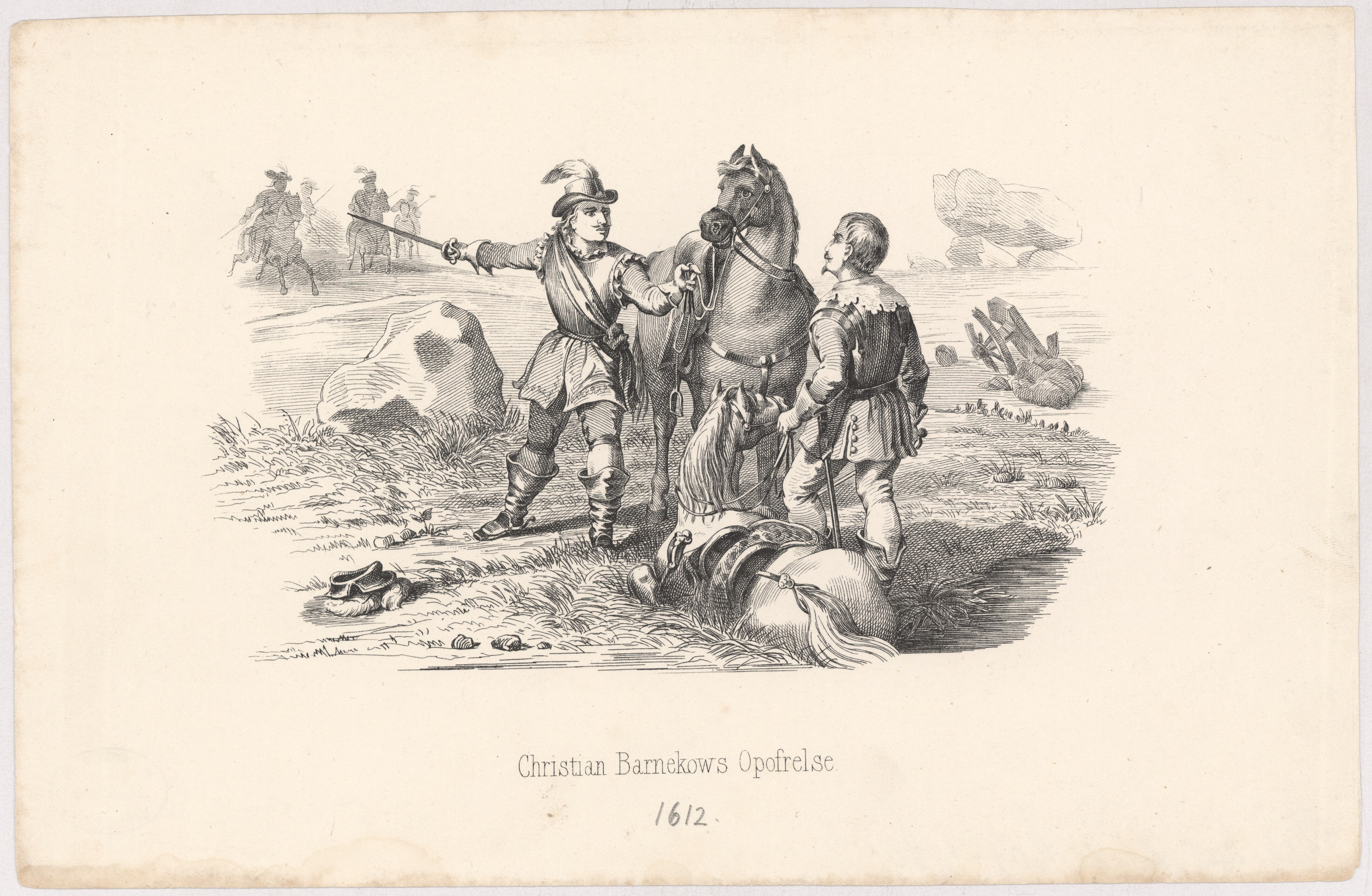
Christian Barnekow's sacrifice, 1612.

Christian Barnekow (24 January 1556 – 21 February 1612) was a Danish nobleman, estate holder and diplomat. He was noted for his extensive travels. He is remembered for sacrificing his own life in an effort to save that of Christian IV in the Battle of Skillingehed at Varberg in Halland. He is thus credited with giving his horse to the king with the words "I give my horse to the king, my life to the enemy and my soul to God". His holdings included Birkholm (now Løvenborg) and Tølløsegård at Holbæk. The street Kristen Bernikows Gade in Copenhagen is named after him. It is located on the site of his former city home.

== Early life and education ==
Barnekow was a son of Pomeranian nobleman Hans Mortensen Barnekow of Birkholm (d. 1559) and Mette Johansdatter Oxe (d. 1582), sister of Danish finance minister and Steward of the Realm, Peder Oxe (1520–1575). His father had acquired Birkholm (now Løvenborg) from the Crown in 1547 at which time he was also ennobled.

Barnekow spent nearly 16 years of his early life travelling throughout Europe and the Middle East, including a three-year journey in the Holy Land and Egypt. He spent six years at the Universities of Jena and Ingolstadt and two years at the University of Padua.

== Career ==
After his return to Copenhagen he became a diplomat for the Danish king, with further travels in Scotland, England, Poland and Brandenburg. Queen Elizabeth gave him gifts of gilt plate weighing 850 ounces.

Probably in 1591 he gave his autograph to Dietrich Bevernest, writing a Spanish proverb, Qui no ci cança, nunca alcança, meaning "those who never grow weary will achieve".

On 12 July 1594 he came to Scotland with Danish envoy Steen Bille (1565-1629) for the baptism of Prince Henry at Stirling Castle. When they arrived Queen Anne left Edinburgh for Falkland Palace because Holyrood Palace was not magnificent enough. King James VI had an audience with them on 15 July, and after a few days arranged for them to lodge in private houses in Lothian because he could not afford to host them. Barnekow and his colleague Steen Bille brought necklaces for Queen Anne and Prince Henry, and King James gave them gold chains, which were heavier than those made for the ambassadors from the dukes of Mecklenburg and Brunswick.

The writer Giacomo Castelvetro, who had been in Edinburgh teaching Italian to James VI and Anne of Denmark, joined his service. In March 1595, the Scottish Jesuit Father James Myreton, brother of the Laird of Cambo, was detained at Leith and brought to King James VI. He said he was sent from Pope Clement VIII and Cardinal Cajetan. He brought a jewel from the Cardinal that depicted the Crucifixion made of gold, crystal, and bone, which King James gave to Queen Anne. The incident was of some significance and was reported to Barnekow, who commented that James VI did not have strong links with Rome.

In September 1597, Barnekow and Arild Huitfeldt (1546–1609) were envoys to London and lodged in Fenchurch Street in the house of Alderman Houghton or the Customer Master Smith. Their mission concerned the Sound tolls. They returned the insignia of the Order of Garter that had belonged to King Frederick II of Denmark. At Theobalds, Queen Elizabeth made a joke at their expense on her birthday, 7 September. After their audiences in London they came to Scotland.

Christian Barnekow came to London with Christian IV in June 1606, and King James gave him a gold chain and a gold medallion.

Barnekow was present at the Battle of Skillingehed at Varberg in Halland. He was killed during the battle supposedly after giving his horse to the king with the words: "I give my horse to the king, my life to the enemy and my soul to God".

== Personal life and property ==
Christian Barnekow inherited Birkholm after the death of his elder brother Johan Barnekow Birkolm in 1603. Barnekow acquired Vittskövle Castle (Vittskövle Slot) in Scania following his marriage to Margareta Brahe (1584-1617), daughter of Henrik Brahe who had completed the castle in 1577. He acquired Tølløsegård (Tølløse Slot) jointly with his brother Jens Barnekow, in 1592 from the estate of Mette Rosenkrantz (1533-1588), widow of Peder Oxe.

Christian Barnekow died in 1612 during the Kalmar War against Sweden after which his widow, Margrethe Brahe, took over his estates together with their two still underage sons Hans Barnekow (b. 1601) and Ove Barnekow (b. 1608). Hans Poulsen Resen (1561-1638), Bishop of the Diocese of Zealand held the funeral session for Barnekow on 26 March 1612 in Elsinore. He noted in his writings that Barnekow brought back with him many rare things, which he had found in foreign countries; unfortunately they have all disappeared.

== Other Sources ==
- Olsen, Gitte Hou (2006) Danish castles and manors (Gudrun Publishing) ISBN 9788779761308
