= Galleri K =

Shopping arcade in Copenhagen, Denmark

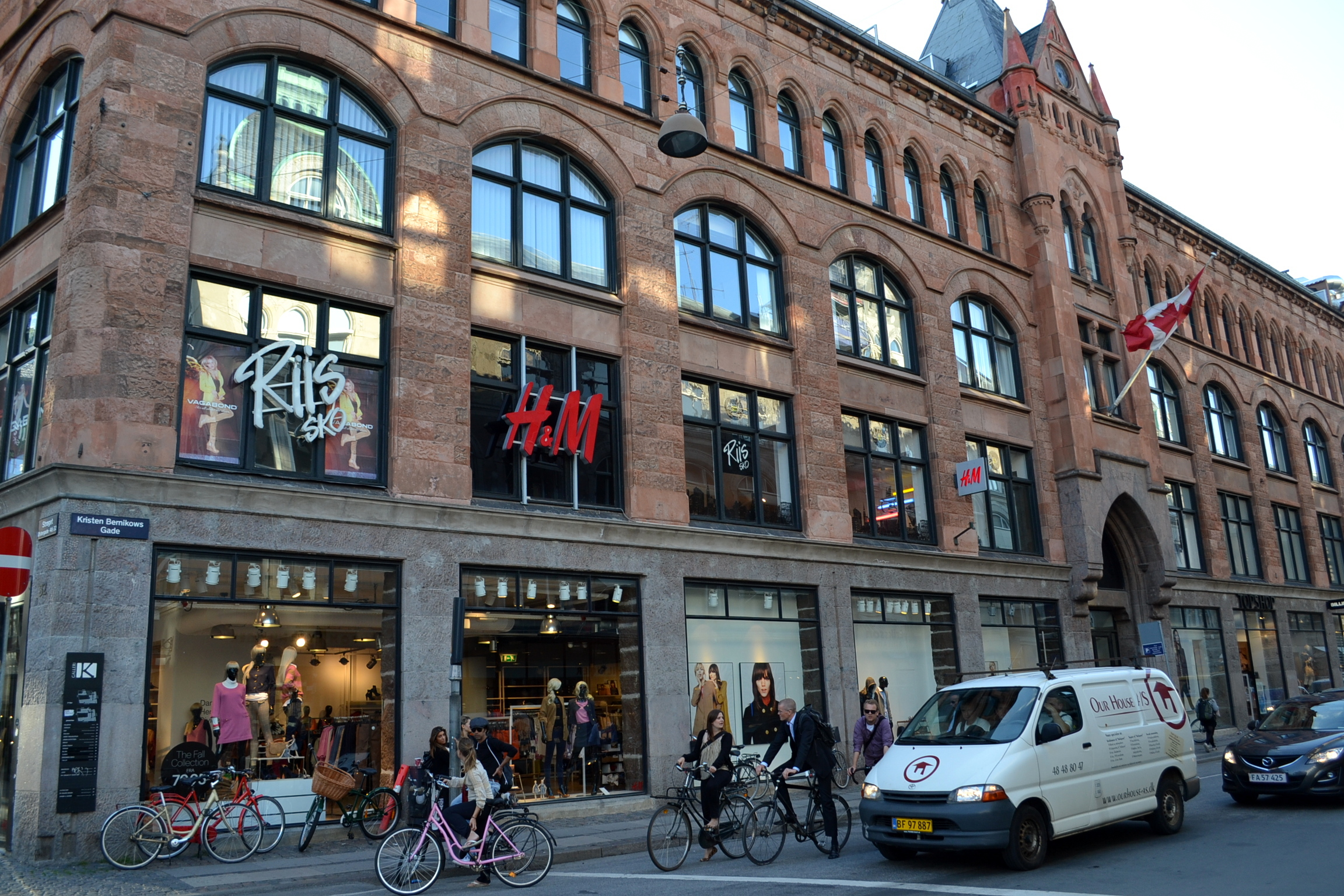
- Interactive map of the Galleri K area

General information
- Location: Copenhagen, Denmark
- Coordinates: 55°40′49″N 12°34′53″E
- Completed: 1901

Galleri K, formerly known as Crome & Goldschmidt and later as Cityarkaden, is a shopping arcade situated on Strøget in central Copenhagen, Denmark. Completed in 1901, it occupies an entire block between Østergade (No. 32-34), Antonigade 2-6), Pilestræde (No. 10-14) and Kristen Bernikows Gade (No. 1).

== History ==
=== Early history ===
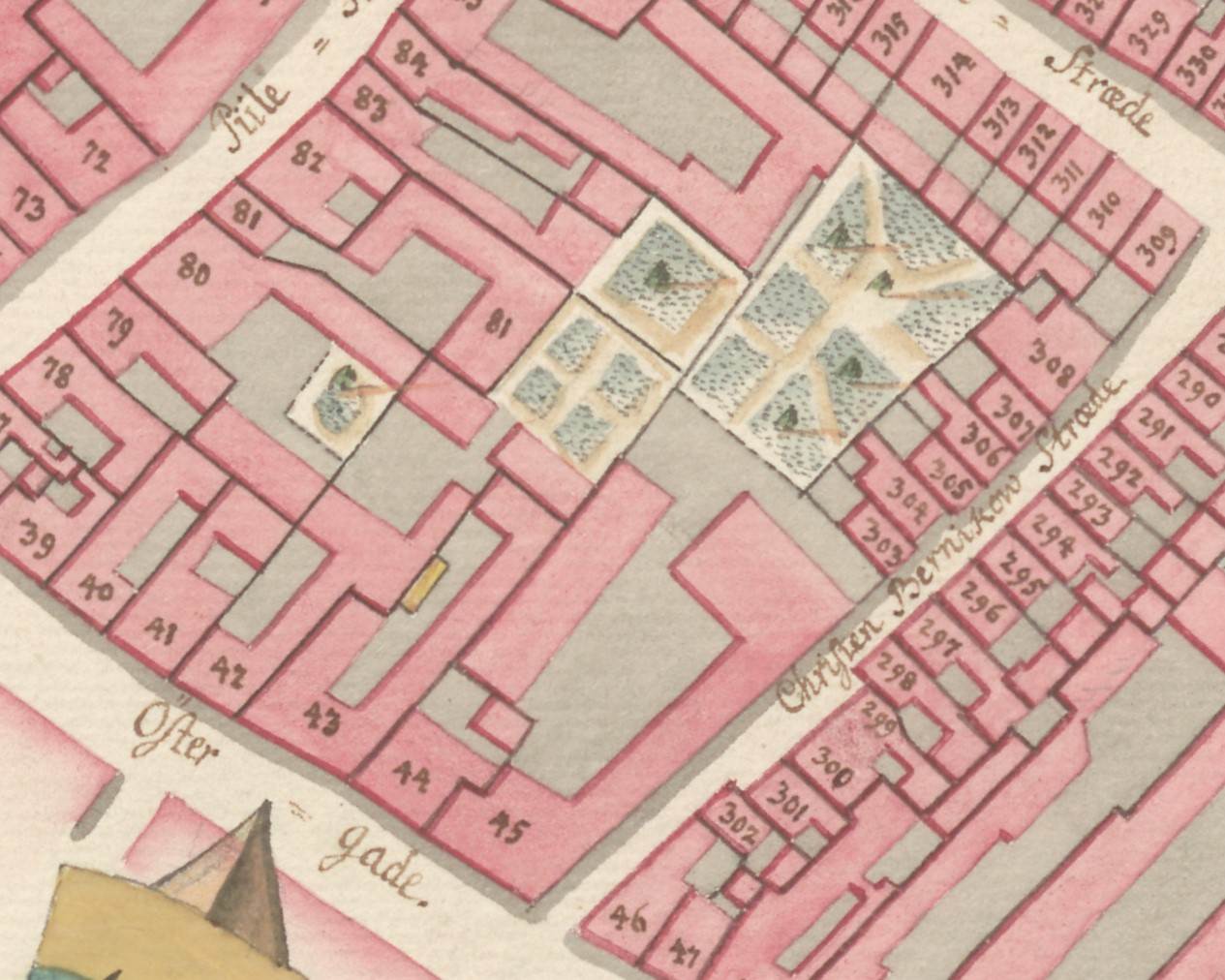
No. 45 seen on a detail from Christian Gedde's map of Købmager Quarter, 1757.

A large property on the site was listed in Copenhagen first cadastre from 1689 listed as No. 45 in Købmager Quarter. It belonged to Dorthe Sørensen, widow of renteskriver Rasmus Sørensen. In the new cadastre of 1756, it was again listed as No. 45 in Købmager Quarter. It was at that time owned by restaurateur Johan Georg Egner.

=== Bindseil family, 1789–1896 ===
In 1789, No. 45 was sold at auctionto merchant Johann August Bindseil. In 1785, he had sold a small property on Fortunstræde and since then lived in rented premises at Nyhavn 17. He was originally from Eisleben. He had worked as a ship's surgeon for the Danish Asiatic Company before settling as a merchant in Copenhagen. He was later licensed as a wholesaler.

The musician and composer Friedrich Ludwig Æmilius Kunzen was a resident in the building from 1807 to 1810.

From 1809 until 1832, Adressekontoret was based in the courtyard to the left. During this period, the building was also referred to as "Adresseavisens Gaard". ("Adresseavisen's Building"). Adressekontoret published Adressecontorets Efterretninger ("Adresseavisen"). Adressekontoret's previous location was at Nytorv No. 8 (now Nytorv 11). /

On 6 July 1810, Jens Jetsmark was engaged as manager of Adressekontoret and editor of Adresseavisen. Jetsmark was married to Bindseil's daughter Augusta Rosalie Bindseil. In 1825, Jelsmark in stalled Denmark's first high-speed printing press in the building. In 1843 (lease signed 11 November 1842), Adressekontoret relocated to significantly larger premises at Vimmelskaftet No. 137 (now Vimmelsaftet 43).

Bindseil died on 18 October 1822. His wife Dorothea née Mentz died on 25 November 1825. Vildmanden was subsequently sold at public auction. It was acquired by their son Carl August Bindseil (died: 2 March 1928).il

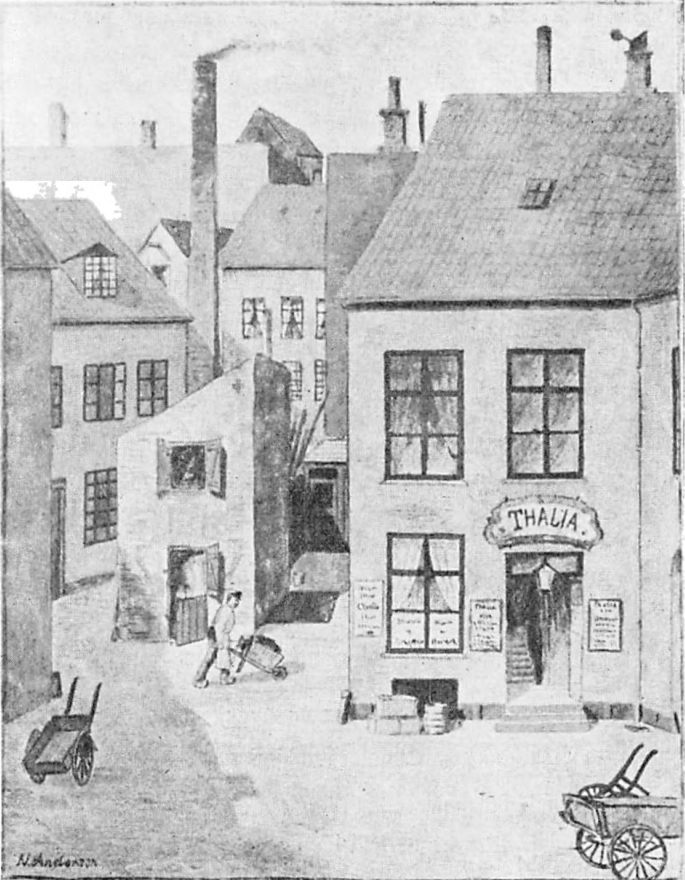
The entrance to Thalia.

On 21 November 1851, Bindseil's garden was let out to his neighbour Antoinne Gamél for an extension of his coffee roastery.

On Christmas Eve 1857, Vildmanden was hit by a fire in the side wing along Kristen Bernikovsgade. Two people were killed and others were injured. A long new wing was subsequently constructed, with shops on the ground floor and meeting rooms for hire on the upper floor. The first floor was later converted into a concert hall. The concert hall was not a commercial success. In October 1864, it was converted into an entertainment venue under the name Thalia. It existed for around 40 years.

Carl August Bindseil died on 4 January 1864. Vildmanden was subsequently passed to his two sons, music teacher Komponist Johan August Bindr and master joiner Christian Valdemar Bindsei. After their deaths, in 1871 and 1883, Vildmanden was jointly owned by their widows, Emilie Bindseil née Møller and Louise née Krause.

=== Crome & Goldschmidt ===
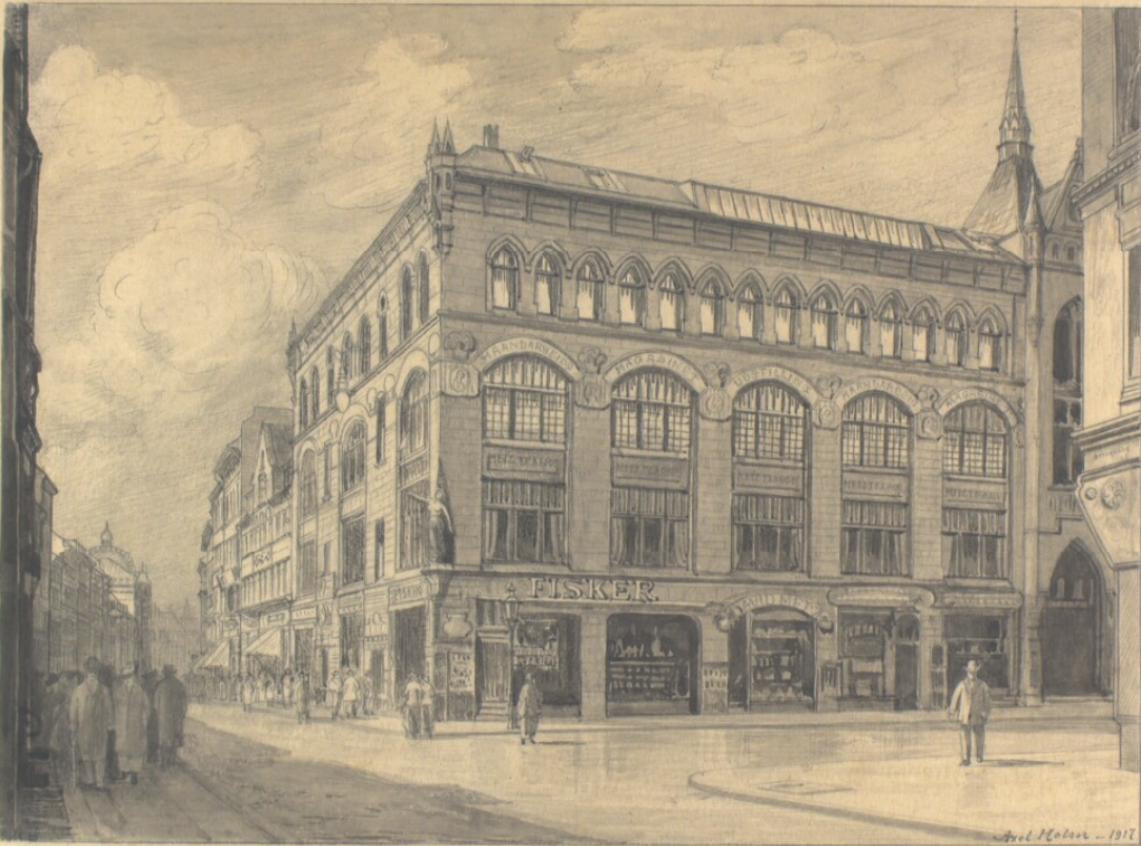
Axel Holm: Volmerhus, 1917

The former building at the site was acquired by Crome & Goldschmidt in 1884 and the company opened a department store in the building in 1887.

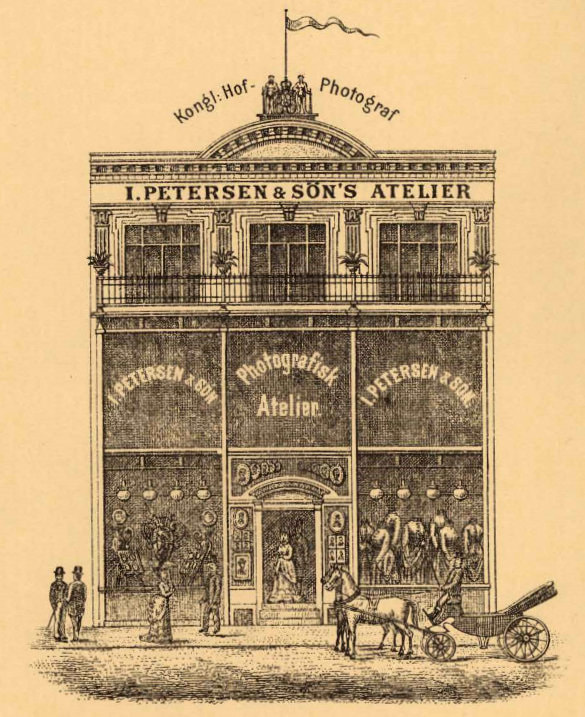
Fotograf J. Petersen & Søns Atelier.

In 1897, two developers, J. Fisker and A. Volmer, purchased the buildings long the street. They constructed a new building known as Volmerhus at the site in connection with a widening of Kristen Bernikows Gade. It was designed by Erik Schiødte (1849-1909) and Christian Arntzen (1852-1911). Crome & Goldschmidt remained a tenant in the building and installed Denmark's first escalators in it in 1927.

=== Cityarkaden, 1971–2004 ===
The department store closed when Crome & Goldschmidt merged with Illum in 1971. It was relaunched as City Arkaden ("The City Arcade").

=== Halleri K, 2004–present ===
In 2004, a joint-venture between the Danish property developer Keops and the American AIG purchased the building. After a major refurbishment, it reopened in 2006 under the current name.

In January 2020, Galleri K was acquired by UK-based Aviva and Canada-based PSP through Capital Investment. In 2004, Jeudan purchased the building for DKK approximately 2 billion.

== Design ==
Galleri K contains about 30 shops and has a total area of about 10,000 square metres over two floors as well as underground parking. The original building is in the Historicist style. A covered atrium and arcade connects Kristen Bernikows Gade to Pilestræde where the architects created a small space with a café.

== In popular culture ==
Crome & Goldschmidt was used as a location in the films En sømand gaar i land (1954) Far til fire i sneen (1954), Far til fire i byen (1956) and Tag til marked i Fjordby (1957).
