= Arild Huitfeldt =

Danish historian and state official (1546–1609)

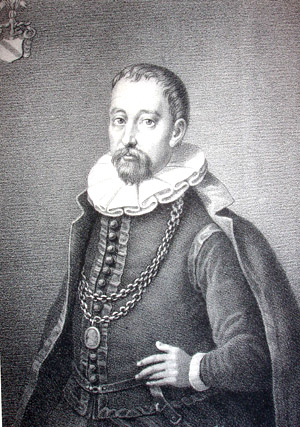

Arild Huitfeldt (Arvid) (11 September 1546 – 16 December 1609) was a Danish historian and state official, known for his vernacular Chronicle of Denmark.

== Life ==
Huitfeldt was born on 11 September 1546, into an aristocratic family from Scania, part of the Kingdom of Denmark at the time. He was partly educated in Germany and France, made his career as a state official and was, from 1573 to 1580, First Secretary to the Danish Chancellery, the King's central administrative organ. From 1583, he was also superintendent at Herlufsholm School, the first Danish boarding school. In 1586, he achieved his highest appointment, becoming Rigskansler (Chancellor of the Realm, the very approximate equivalent to a modern Minister of Justice), until shortly before his death. Huitfeldt also owned several manor estates and handled a number of diplomatic assignments. As a politician and as an official he appears to have been studious, conservative, and sociable, avoiding overt clashes with his colleagues.

In September 1597, Huitfeldt and Christian Barnekow were ambassadors in London and lodged in Fenchurch Street in the house of Alderman Houghton or the Customer Master Smith. Their mission concerned the Sound tolls. They returned the insignia of the Order of Garter that had belonged to Frederick II of Denmark. Queen Elizabeth made a joke at their expense on her birthday. After their audiences in London they came to Scotland.

== Historical works ==
What has made Huitfeldt famous, however, is his contribution as a historian. He wrote the first great History of Denmark in vernacular Danish – Danmarks Riges Krønike (Chronicle of the Kingdom of Denmark, 8 vols, 1595-1603), thus taking up the weighty legacy of Saxo Grammaticus. Huitfeldt was no official Danish historiographer, but at his time several official attempts at writing a comprehensive History of Denmark in Latin had come to little. Huitfeldt created a work that supplanted all earlier Latin attempts and more or less became the referential history work on Denmark until the time of Ludvig Holberg.

The Chronicle deals with Denmark from what was then a time of legend until 1559. It is mostly structured around the reigns of the various kings and was published in non-chronological order, beginning with the time of Christian III. Though published rather quickly, his work seems to have been prepared across several years. Being a state official with access to documents and with the possibility of using help from scribes, Huitfeldt did have many writing advantages. The form of his Chronicle is annalist but not narrowly limited to each single year. What makes it still more important is that Huitfeldt reproduces many documents and sources the originals of which are now lost. In that way his book is also a significant source collection.

In the Chronicle Huitfeldt reveals himself as a pragmatic aristocrat. A central view of his is that history repeats itself, but in aspects such as his emphasis on judicial and constitutional factors, he shows himself rather in advance of his time. At bottom, he remains subjective: his own ideal is that of the aristocratic state, in which the King respects the role and power of the nobility. Thus he may be held responsible for the extremely negative picture of Christian II, and the corresponding idealized version of Christian III, which for many years dominated Danish historical thinking. Yet as a whole, Huitfeldt is sober and calm, using plain and relatively unaffected language. While transmitting the ancient legends and myths he often shows scepticism as to their reliability, an attitude he also partly displays toward later sources. His prefaces to the separate volumes of his history are themselves worth noting, as an additional testimonial to his political ideals.

== Bibliography ==
- Dansk Biografisk Leksikon, vol. 6. Copenhagen: Gyldendal, 1979-84.
- Gyldendal og Politikens Danmarkshistorie, vol. 7. Copenhagen: Gyldendal and Politiken, 1988-93.
- Arrild Huitfeldt: Rigis Krönicke fra Kong Dan den förste oc indtil Kong Knud den 6, t. 1
- Arrild Huitfeldt: Rigis Krönicke fra Kong Dan den förste oc indtil Kong Knud den 6, t. 2
