= Østergade 13, Copenhagen =

Building in Copenhagen

Østergade 13
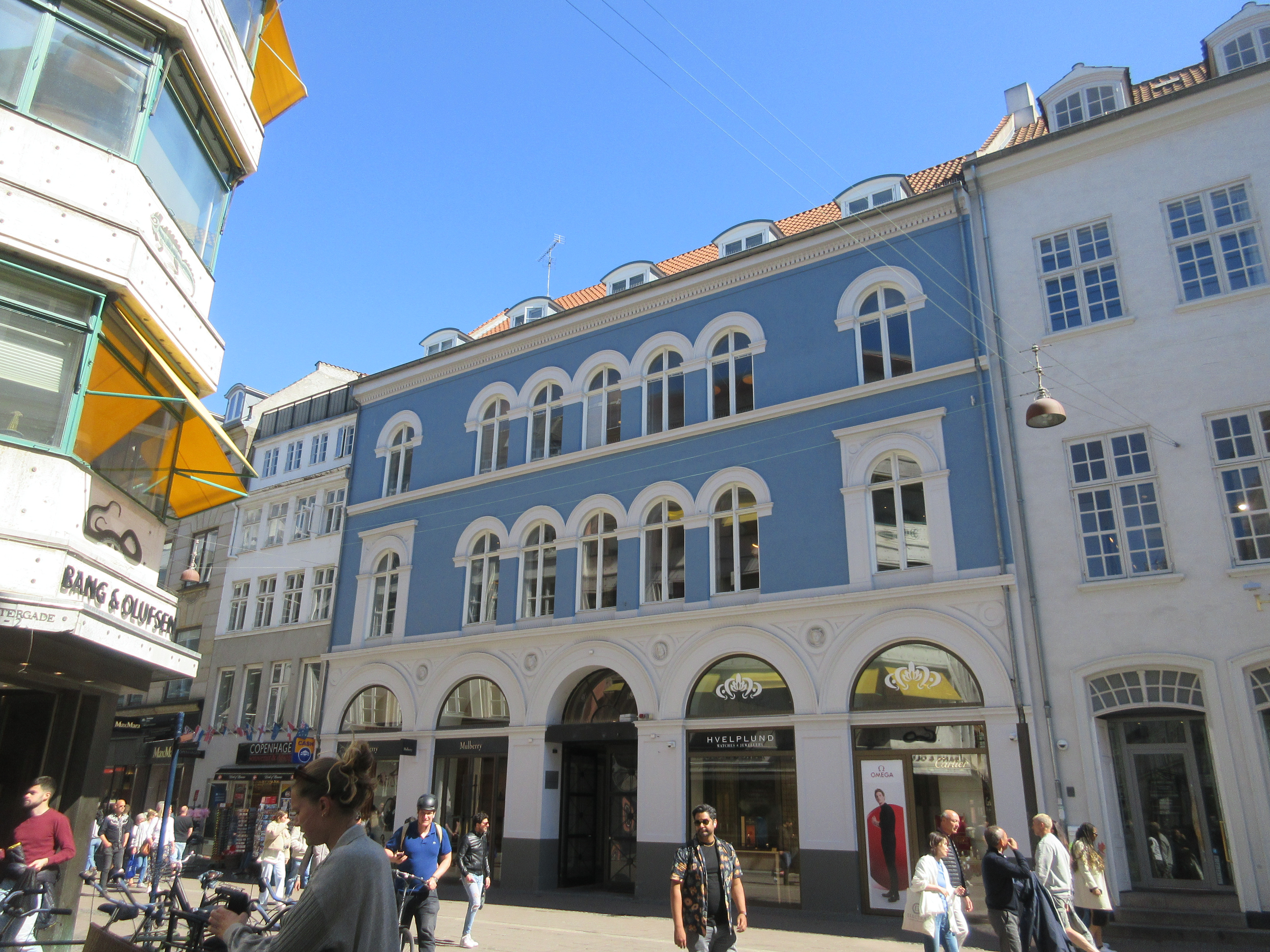
- Østergade 13 in 2023.
- Interactive map of the Østergade 13 area

General information
- Location: Copenhagen, Denmark
- Coordinates: 55°40′47.9″N 12°35′01.2″E
- Completed: 1856

Østergade 13 is a Historicist building complex situated on the shopping street Strøget in central Copenhagen, Denmark. Originally two separate 18th-century buildings, three and four bays wide, respectively, Østergade 13 owes its current appearance to a renovation in 1856. Kunstforeningen was also based in the building from 1834 to 1854.

== Architecture ==
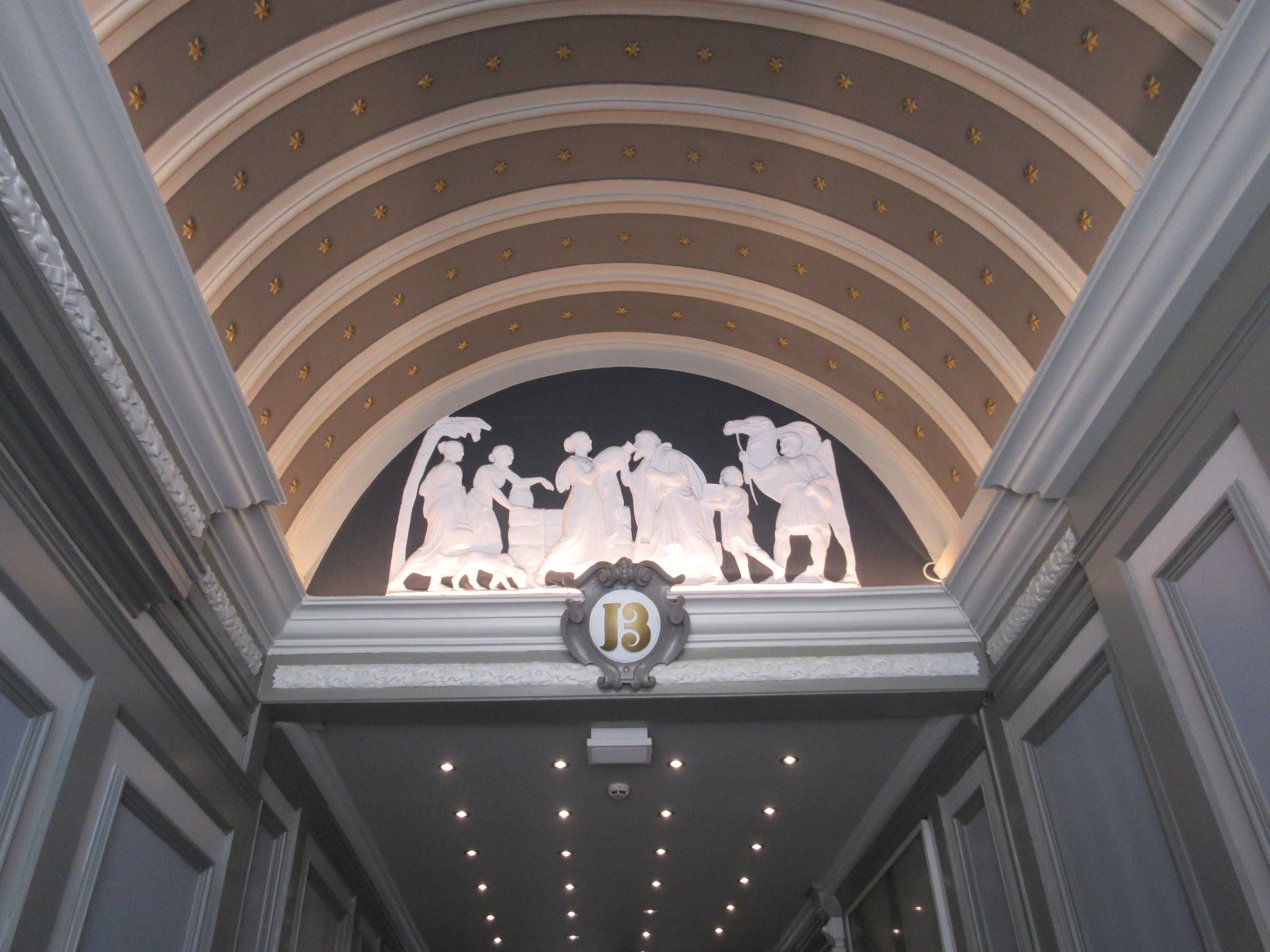
Detail of the main entrance.

Østergade 13 originates in two separate buildings. The western building was constructed prior to the Copenhagen Fire of 1728. It was later subject to alterations in 1773. The eastern building was constructed before 1749. The two buildings were both adapted in the 1830s and finally to their present appearance in 1856. The present building is a fourwinged complex surrounding a central courtyard. The central main entrance opens to a long corridor. It features a lunette with a silhouette of a group of people and the house number just inside the main entrance.
