= Kristen Bernikows Gade =

Street in Copenhagen, Denmark

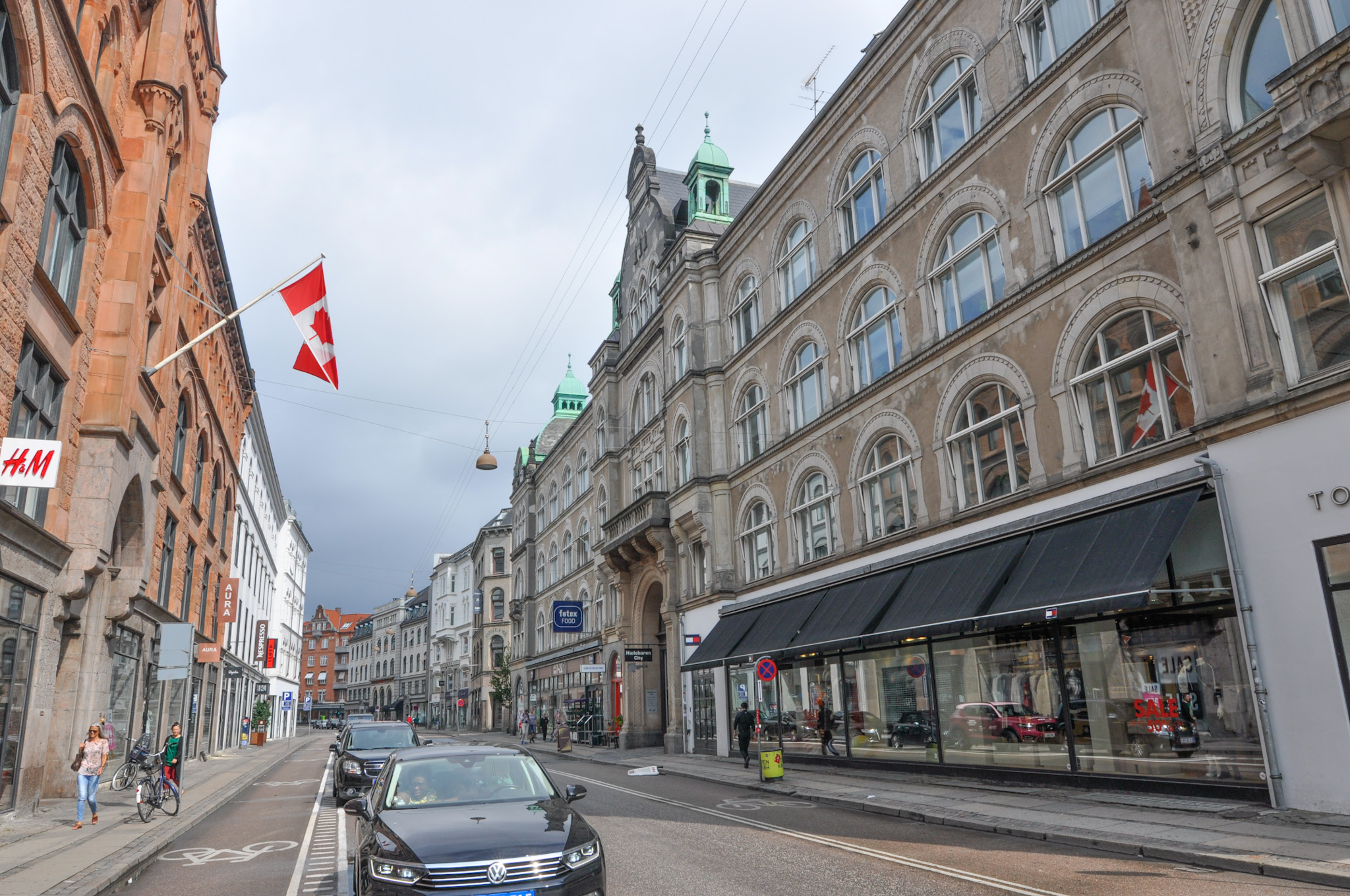
- Length: 173 m (568 ft)
- Location: Copenhagen, Denmark
- Quarter: Indre By
- Postal code: 1105
- Nearest metro station: Gammel Strand
- Coordinates: 55°40′49.44″N 12°34′55.2″E
- South end: Strøget
- North end: Gammel Mønt

Kristen Bernikows Gade is a street in central Copenhagen, Denmark. It extends north from the major shopping street Strøget to Grønnegade where it turns into Gammel Mønt. Together with Bremerholm, its extension to the south, it forms one of only two places where car traffic crosses pedestrianized Strøget on its way from Kongens Nytorv to the City Hall Square, the other being at Gammeltorv-Nytorv. The street is named for the nobleman Christian Barnekow, one of Christian IV's men, whose city home was located on the site. Most of the buildings date from a widening of the street in around 1900. They include the shopping archade Galleri K.

== History ==
=== Origins ===
In the Middle Ages, the site was an open sewer which continued to the harbor. In 1547, it was decided to convert it into a narrow alley. The property on the site belonged to Marcus Reff, a merchant, who was awarded a reduction of his property taxes from 15 mark to 10 mark as compensation. The alley was officially opened on 10 July 1547.

In 1607, Christian Barnekow (1556–1612) acquired a property at the beginning of the street. Barnekow was the owner of the estates Birkholm (now Løbenborg) and Tølløsegård at Holbæk. The alley next to his former city home was from 1620 known as Christen Bernekousstræde.

=== 17th century ===
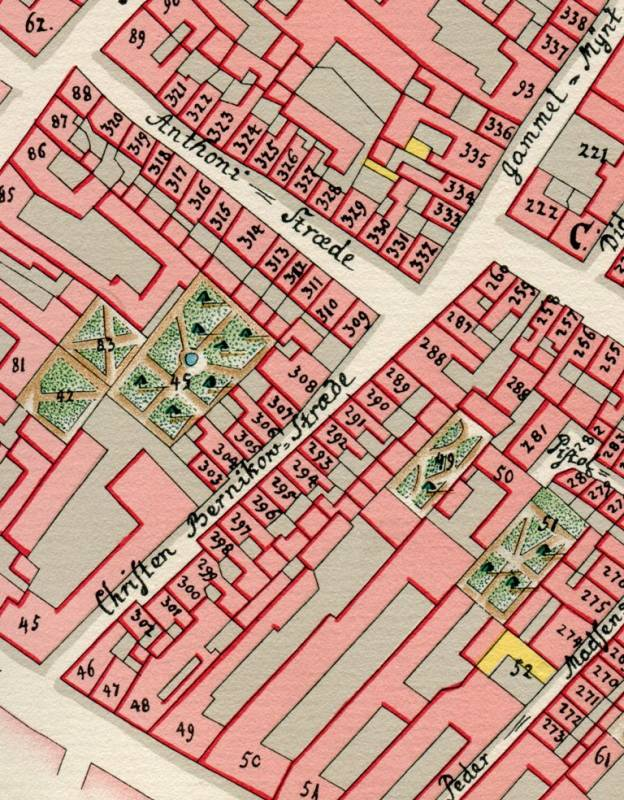
Kristen Bernikows Stræde seen in a detail of Christian Gedde's map of St. Ann's West Quarter, 1757

Barnikow's former property remained the by far largest property in the narrow street. It was listed in the new cadastre of 1756 as No. 45 in Købmager Quarter, owned by restaurateur Johan Georg Egner. The smaller corner property on the other side of the street was listed as No. 46 in Købmasger Quarter, owned by book binder Johan Fredeirk. The rest of the street was lined with mostly very small properties. The properties on the east side of the street were listed from north to south as No. 287–302. The properties on west side of the street (adjacent to Barnekow's former property) were listed from south to north as No. 303–309.

=== 19th century ===
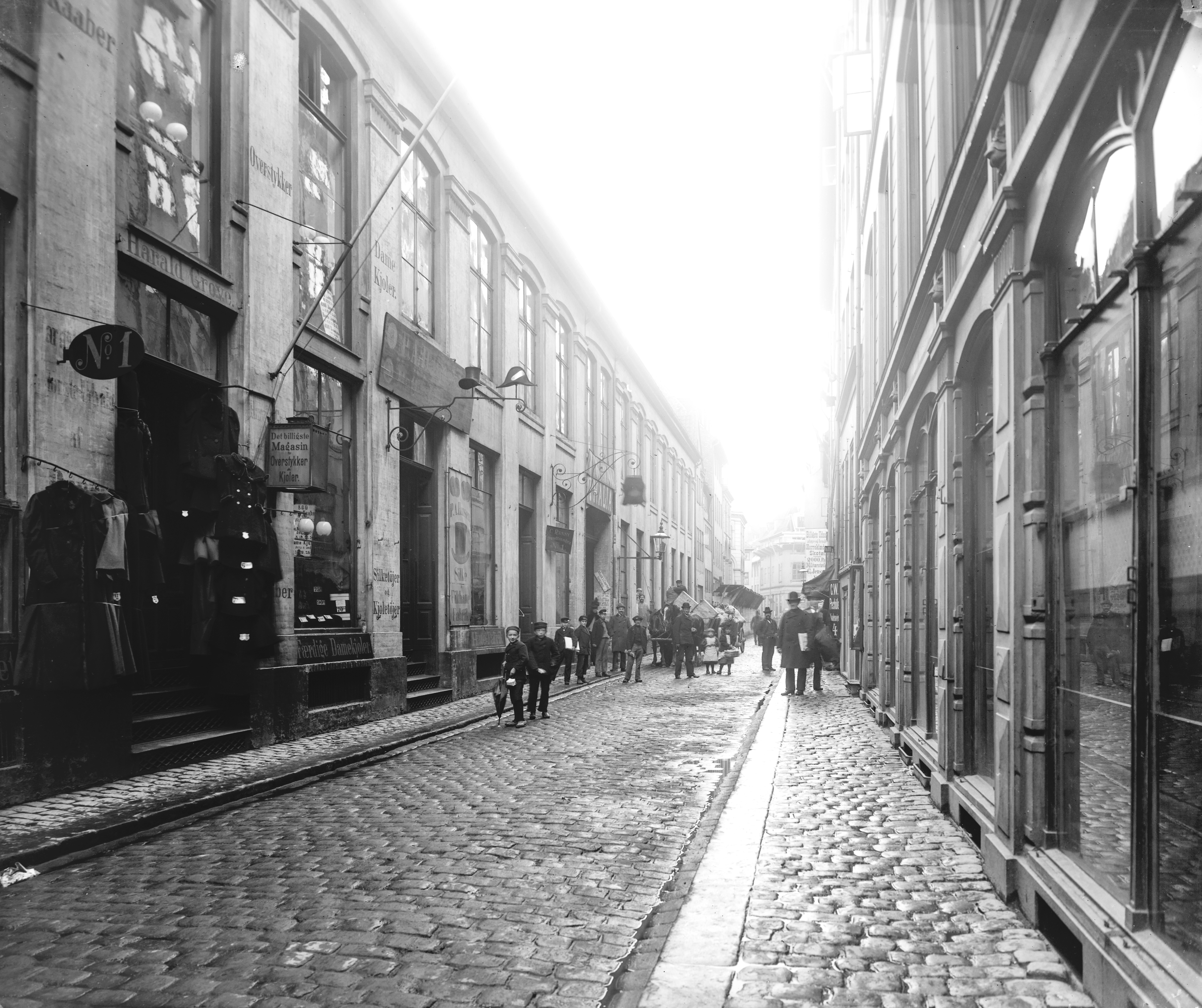
Kristen Bernikows Stræde, photographed by Johannes Hauerslev

The department store Chrom & Gldschmit opened on the corner with Østergade (Strøget) in 1887. In 1897, two developers, J. Fisker and A. Volmer, purchased the buildings along the street. An initial proposal for a renewal of the buildings along the street by the architects Henrik Hagemann and Alfred Møller was not used.

=== 20th century ===
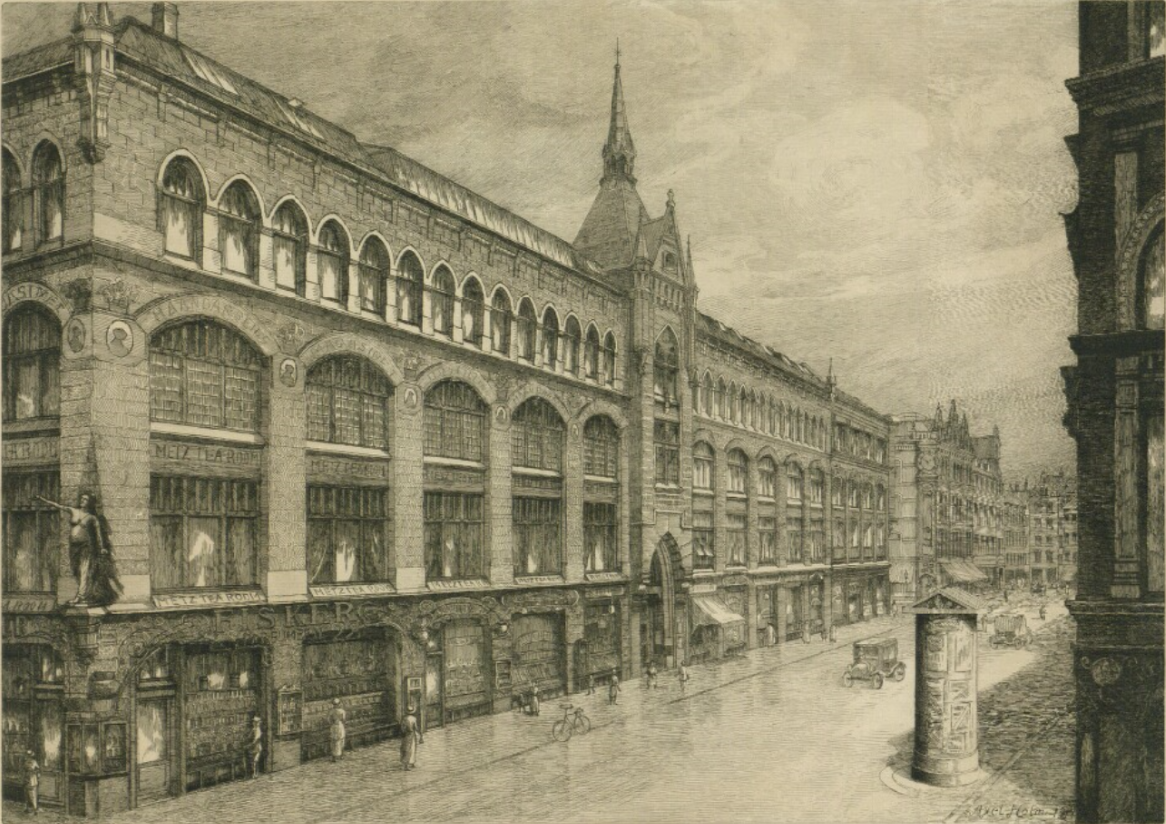
Kristen Bernikows Gade in 1919

A competition launched in 1900 was won by Christian Arntzen and Erik Schiødte. The street was widened and all buildings were replaced by new ones over the next few years. Crome & Goldschmidt existed until 1971. A new shopping arcade, Cityarkaden, opened in the building in 1974 and existed until 2004.

== Notable buildings and residents ==
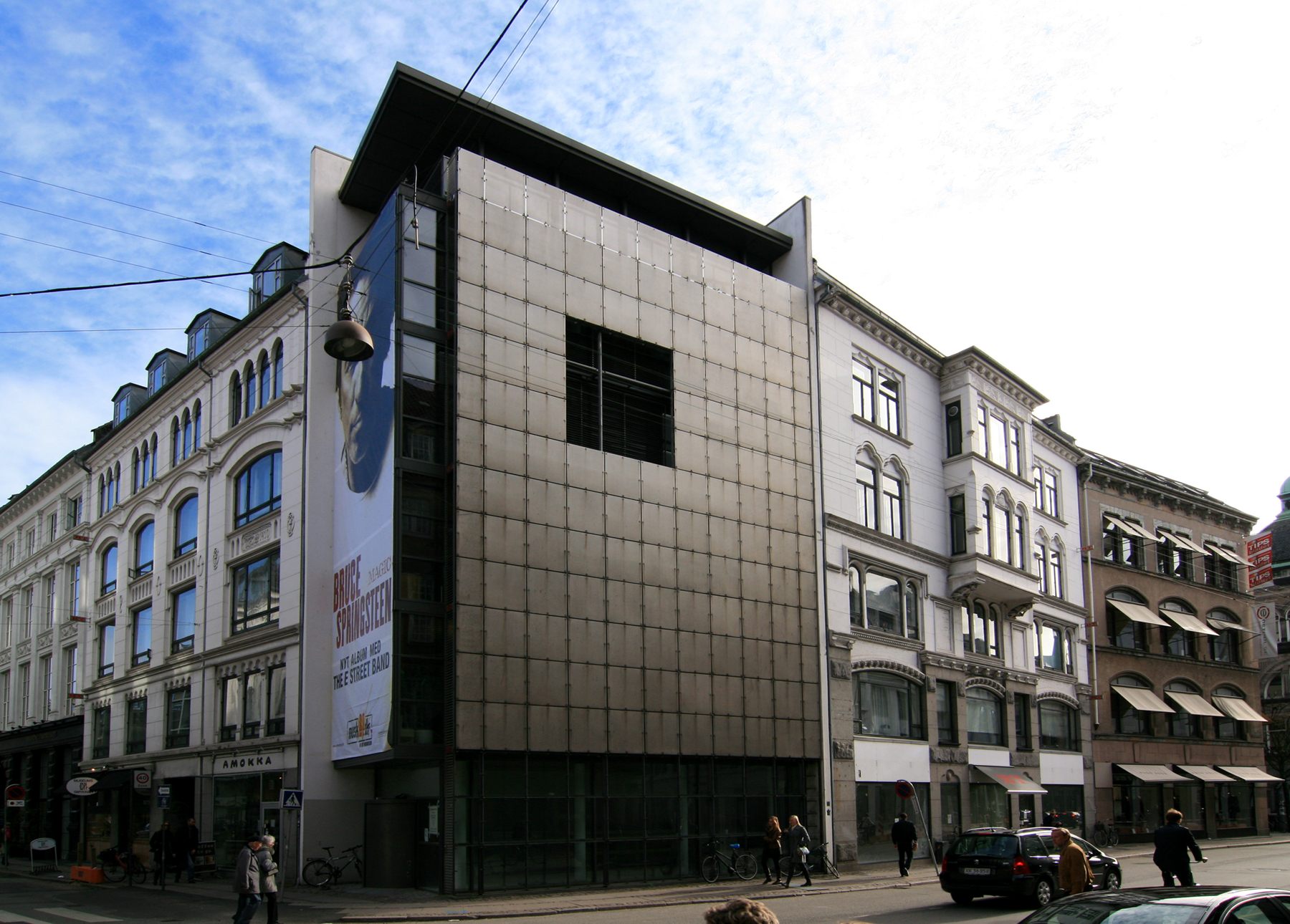
BT House

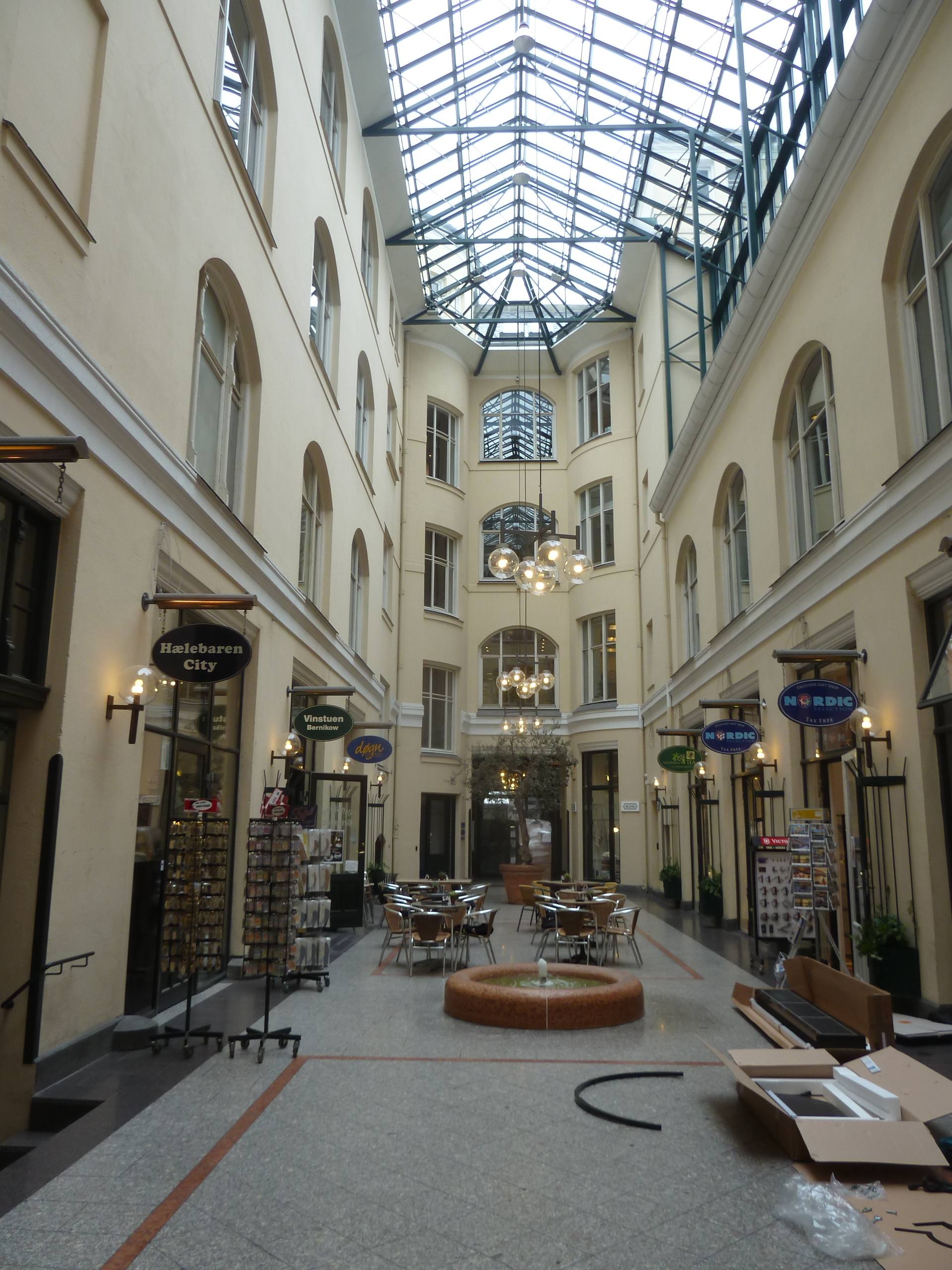
Bernikowgården

Chrom & Goldschmidt's former building now houses the shopping arcade Galleri K. The building on the other side of the street (No. 2), Cityhus, was designed by Erik Schiødte and Christian Arntzen. The building contains a covered shopping arcade which was created in 1988. Schiødte also designed Barnekowhus at No. 4.

The tabloid BT is based in the BT House (No. 8) on the corner with Grønnegade. The building was completed in 1995 and is designed by Henning Larsen.

Today, Kristen Bernikows Gade 1 houses the Embassy of Canada as well as the Danish affiliate of the international media agency group GroupM.

== See also ==
- Ny Østergade
