= Antonigade =

Street in Copenhagen, Denmark

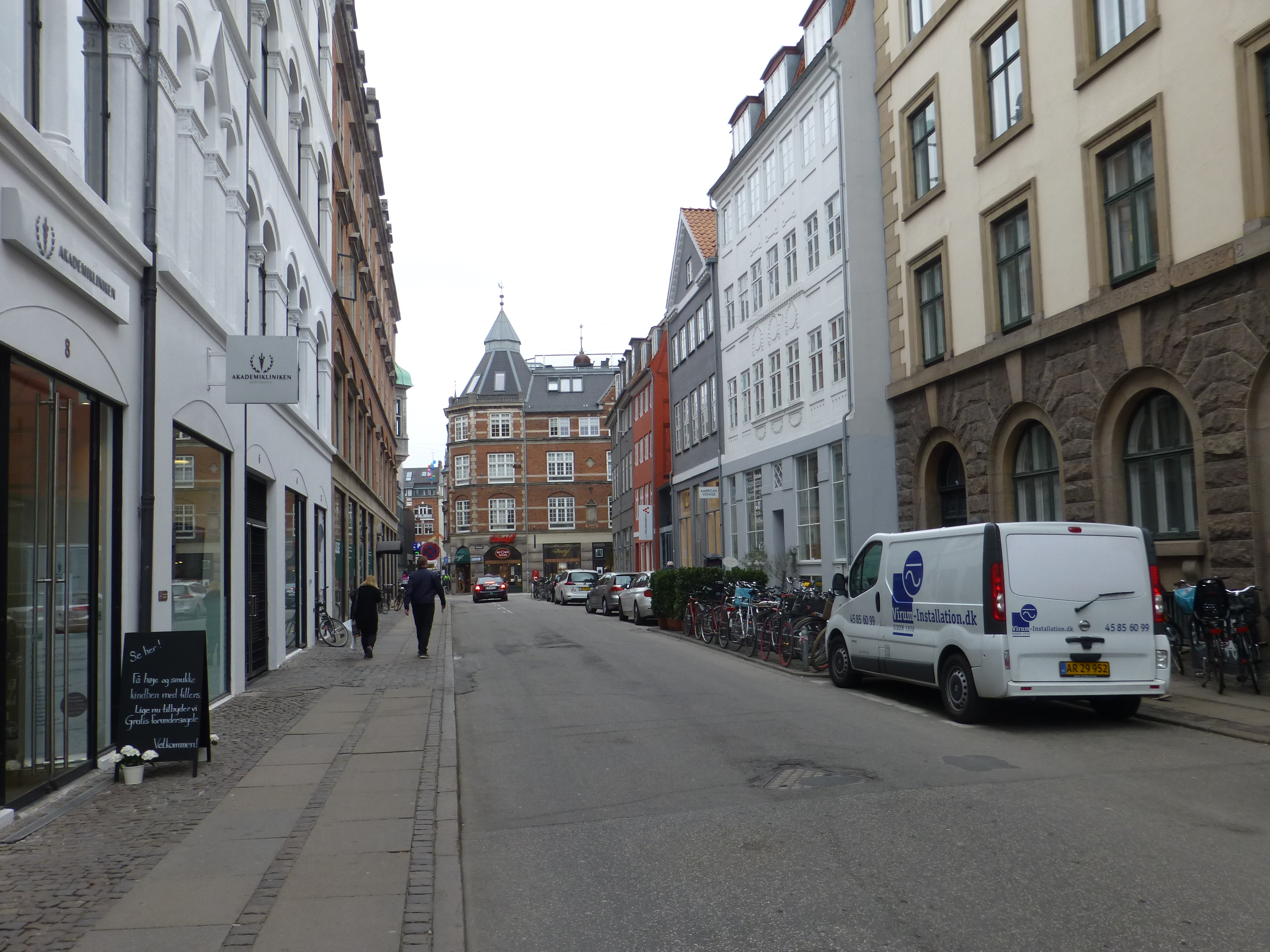
- Length: 84 m (276 ft)
- Location: Copenhagen, Denmark
- Quarter: Indre By
- Nearest metro station: Kongens Nytorv
- Coordinates: 55°40′49.24″N 12°34′52.87″E
- Southwest end: Pilestræde
- Northeast end: Kristen Bernikows Gade

Antonigade is a street in the Old Town of Copenhagen, Denmark. It runs from Pilestræde in the southwest to Kristen Bernikows Gade in the northeast. No. 3 and No. 9 are listed on the Danish registry of protected buildings and places.

== History ==
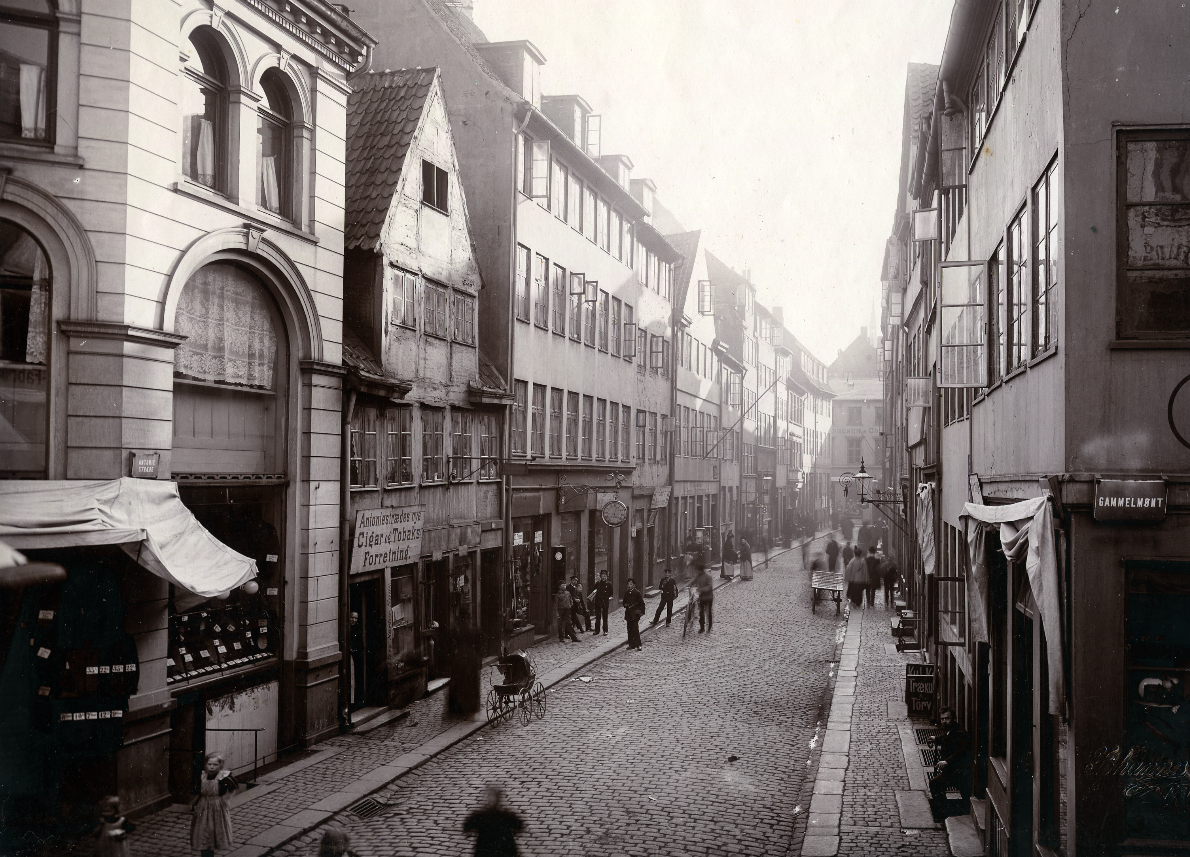
Antonigade in 1900

The street was in the Middle Ages known as Lille Pilestræde (Little Pilestræde). Its name was later changed to Antonistræde after the Hospital Brothers of St. Anthony in Præstø who until the Reformation owned a building approximately where Silkegade 6Mbsash&8 is today. The street was renamed Antonigade in connection with an extension in 1901.

== Buildings ==
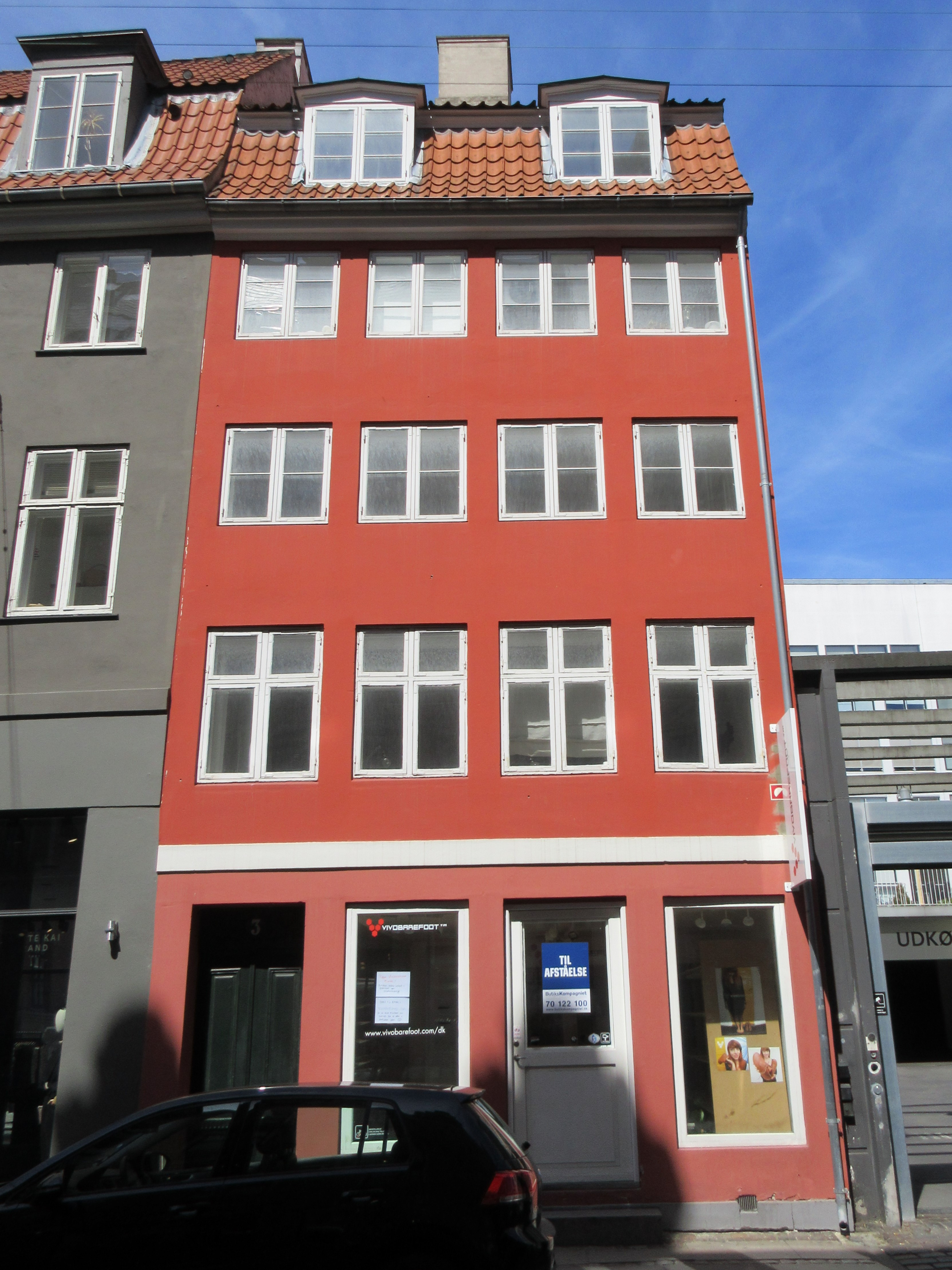
Antonigade 3

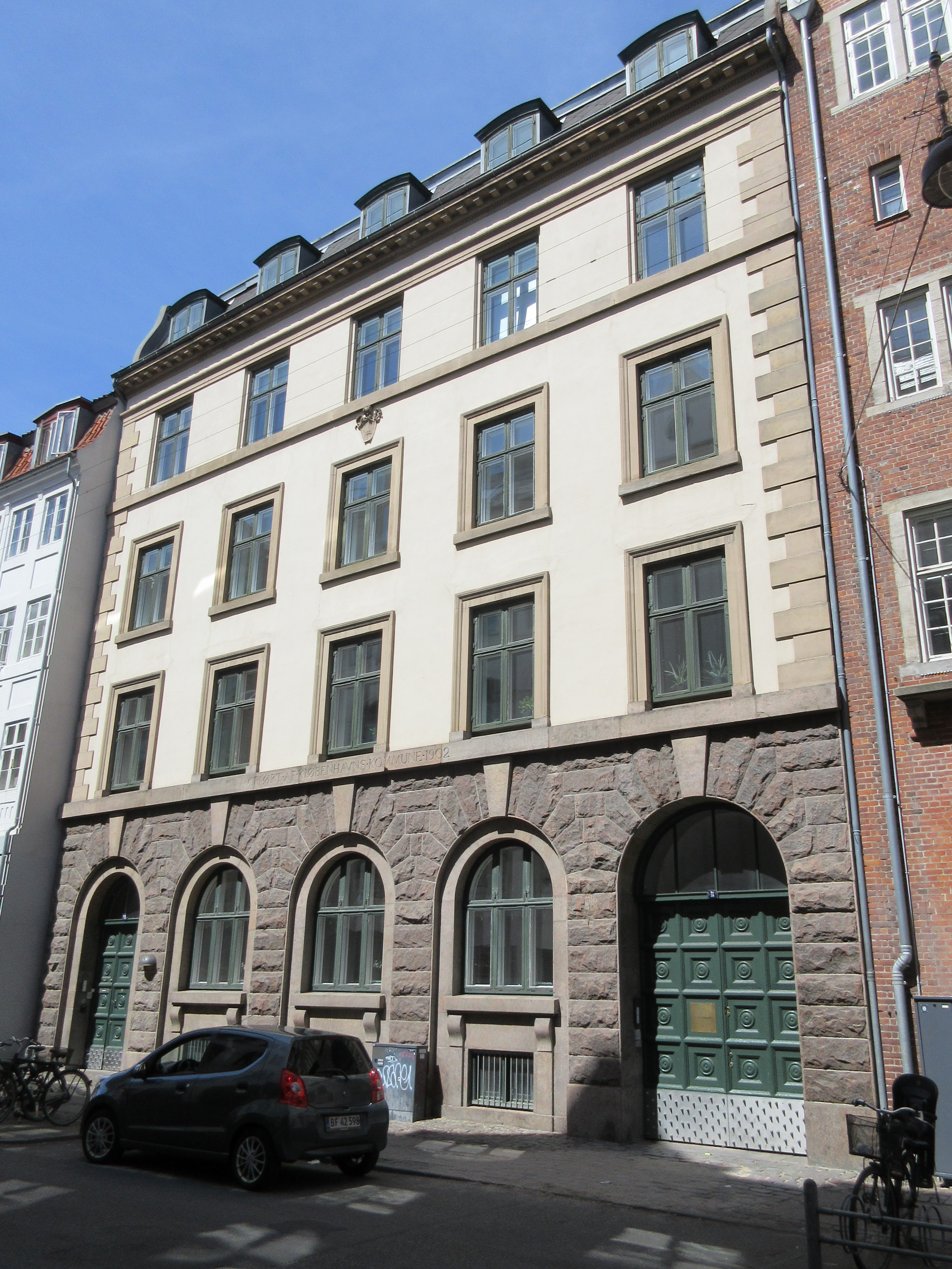
Antonigade 11.

No. 3 and No. 9 are listed. No. 3 dates from before 1682 but was heightened some time between 1713 and 1733 and altered between 1768 and 1779. No. 9 was built in 1766 by the architect Hans Næss for his own use.

The building at No. 11. with rustication on its ground floor, is a former police station. It was built in 1902 to design by city architect Hans Wright (1854–1925). The police station was decommissioned in 1990-1991 and the building has later been converted into offices.
