= Gasværksvej =

Street in Copenhagen

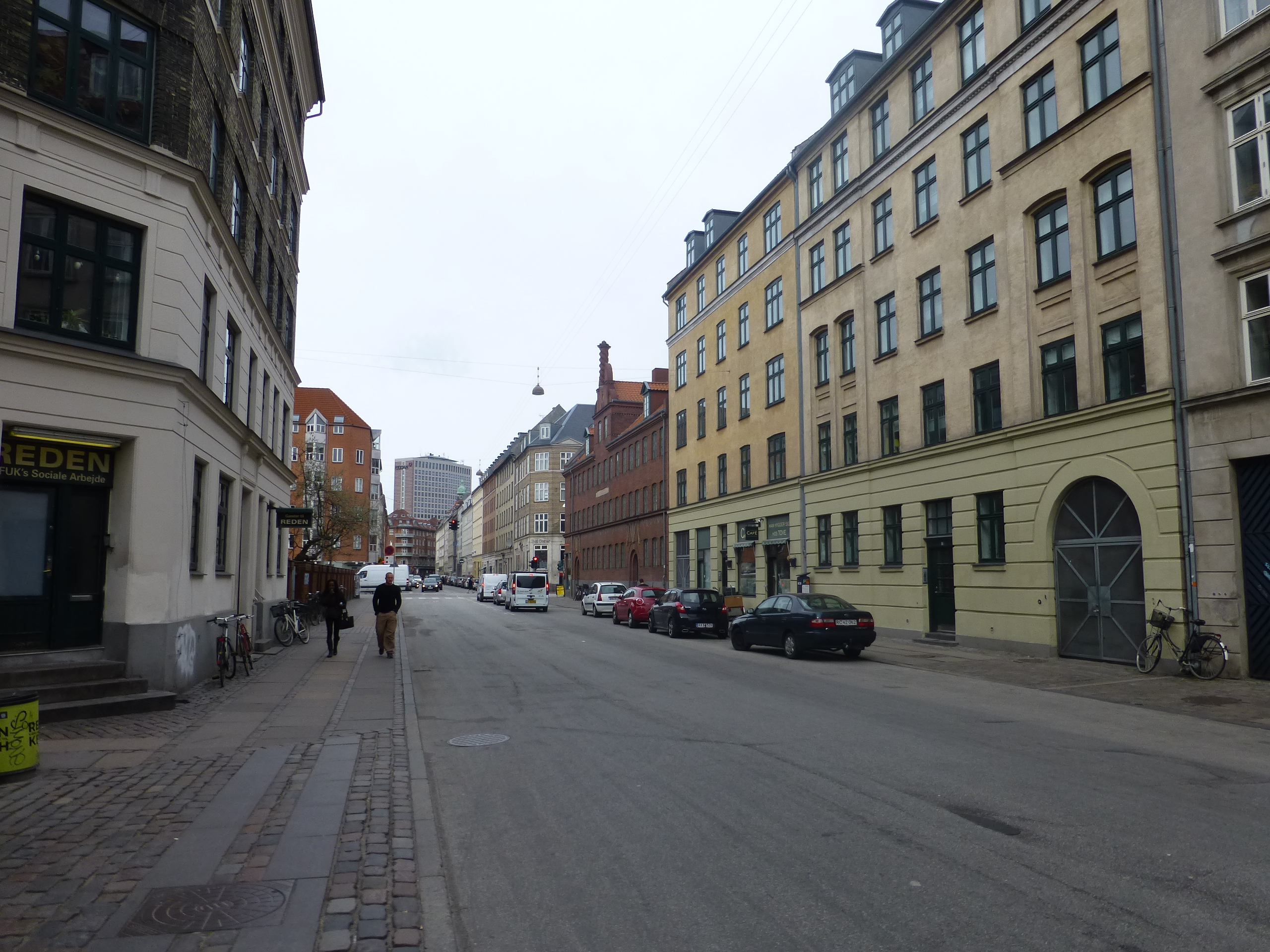
- Length: 180 m (590 ft)
- Location: Copenhagen, Denmark
- Quarter: Vesterbro
- Nearest metro station: Copenhagen Central Station
- North end: Vesterbros Torv
- Major junctions: Istedgade
- South end: Halmtorvet

Gasværksvej (lit. "Gasworks Road") is a street in the Vesterbro district of Copenhagen, Denmark. It runs from Vesterbros Torv in the north to Halmtorvet in the south.

== History ==
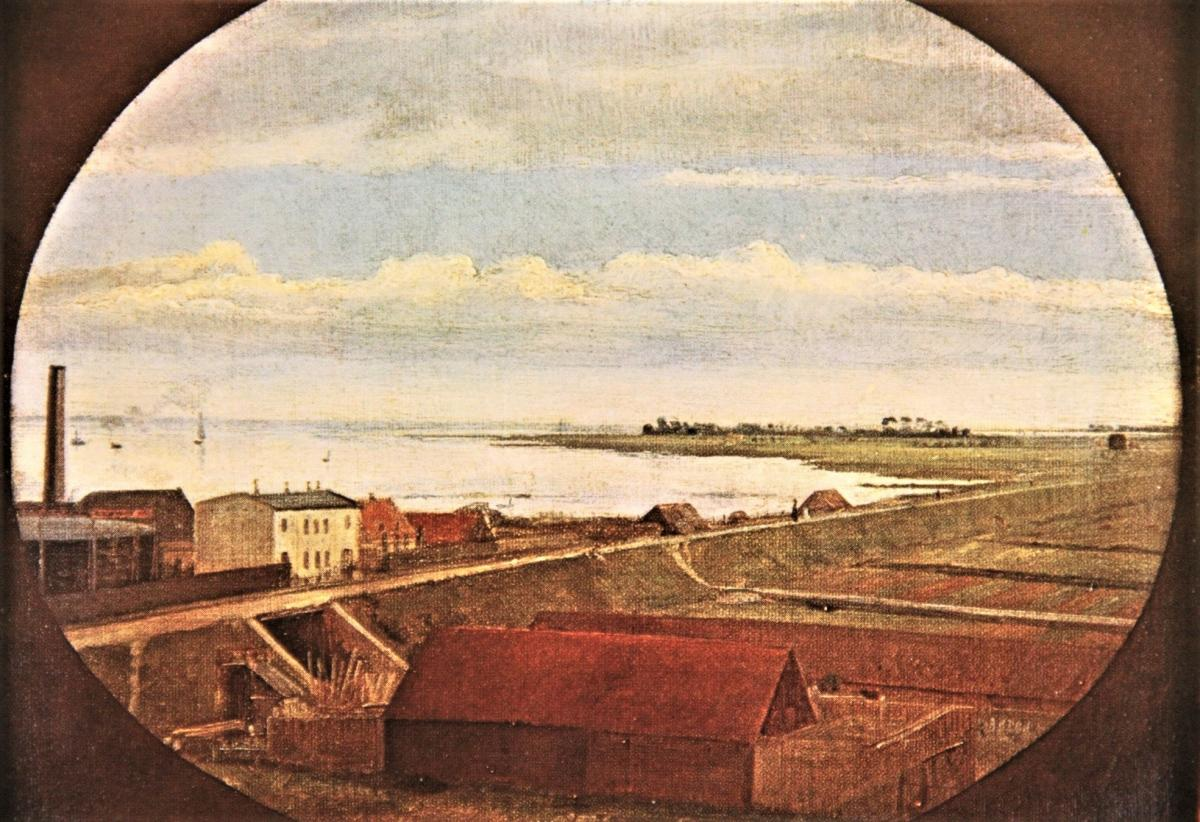
Painting from 1880: The Western Gasworks can be seen in the upper right corner and the tunnel which took Gasværksvej under the railway embankment can also be seen to the left

The land where the street runs today was formerly the site of a number of ropewalks. They ran all the way from Vesterbrogade and down to Kalvebod Beach.

Denmark's first railway, between Copenhagen and Roskilde, ran on an embankment along the beach from 1847.

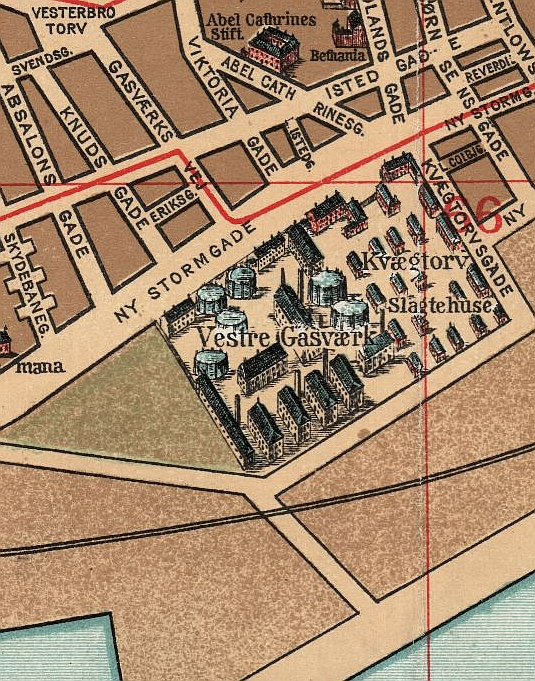
Gasværksvej and the Western Gasworks seen on a map detail from the 1890s

In 1853, it was decided to build Copenhagen's first gasworks on Kalvebod Beach. Gasværksvej, which was projected at the same time, was made extra wide to secure good access to the new installation. The gasworks started operations on 4 December 1857. It closed in 1927 and was replaced by the White Meet-Packing District.

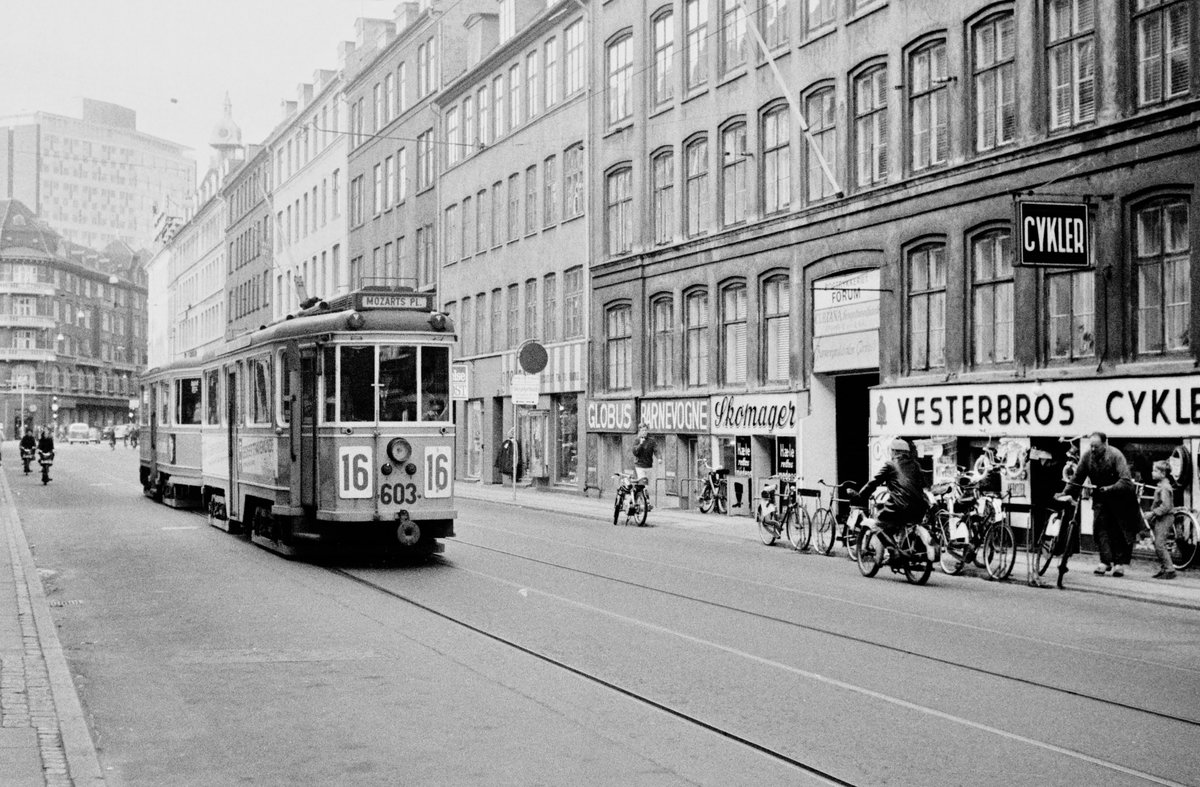
A line 16 tram on Gasværksvej

Gasværksvej continued under the railway in a tunnel. In 1864, the rail line was moved to a more northern course, through Frederiksberg, before being moved to its current position just south of Sønder Boulevard in 1911. The railway was later replaced by a direct extension of Stormgade which was given the name Ny Stormgade. Copenhagen's haymarket relocated to the site in the 1880s and that section of Ny Stormgade was therefore renamed Halmtorvet (Haymarket) in 1896.

Copenhagen Tramways Line 16 operated through Gasværksvej on its way from Toftegårds Plads in Valby to Emdrup Torv.

== Notable buildings ==
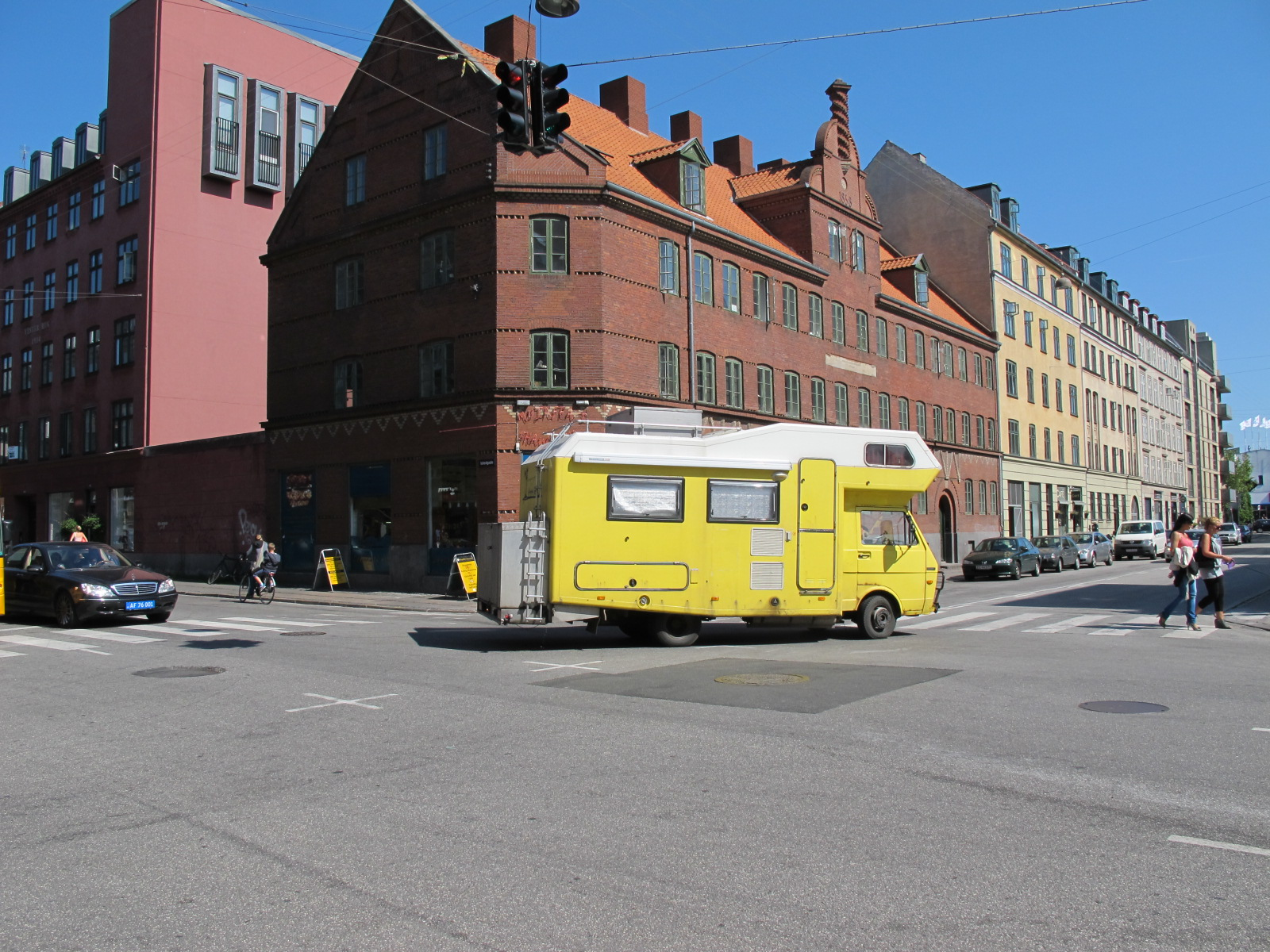
No. 25-27: Skomagersvendebroderskabets Stiftelse

Skomagersvendebroderskabets Stiftelse (No. 25-27) was built in 1858 to provide affordable housing for shoemakers in reduced circumstances. The building was designed by Christian Ferdinand Rasmussen. In 1992, it was put through a comprehensive restoration and was listed on the Danish registry of protected buildings and places.

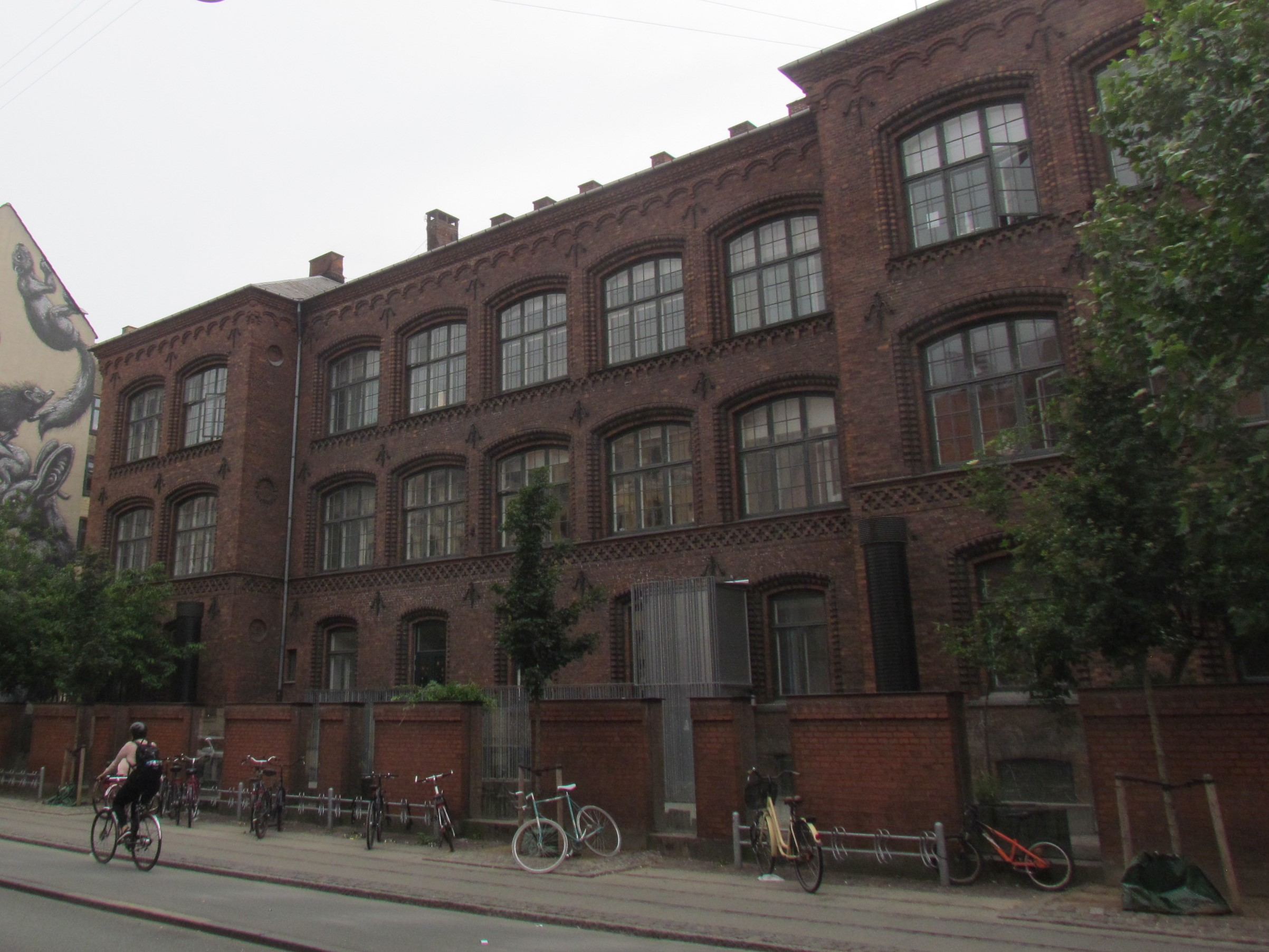
No. 22: Gasværksvej School

Gasværkvej School (No. 22) opened in 1880. The building was designed by Hans Jørgen Holm. It was expanded by city architect Hans Jørgen Holm in 1969–1971.

The buildings at No. 12 (1882–83) and No. 26 (1887–88) were both designed by Roger Møller. No. 8 is a former workshop building from 1893 designed by Thorvald Sørensen.

== Public art and memorials ==
On Gasværksvej School is a plaque commemorating Axel Carl Sophus Jacobsen (1916–1945) who was killed during the occupation of Denmark in World War II.

== Transport ==
The nearest S-train and metro station is Copenhagen Central Station.
