= Strøget =

Pedestrian zone in Copenhagen, Denmark

Coordinates: 55.679°N 12.575°E

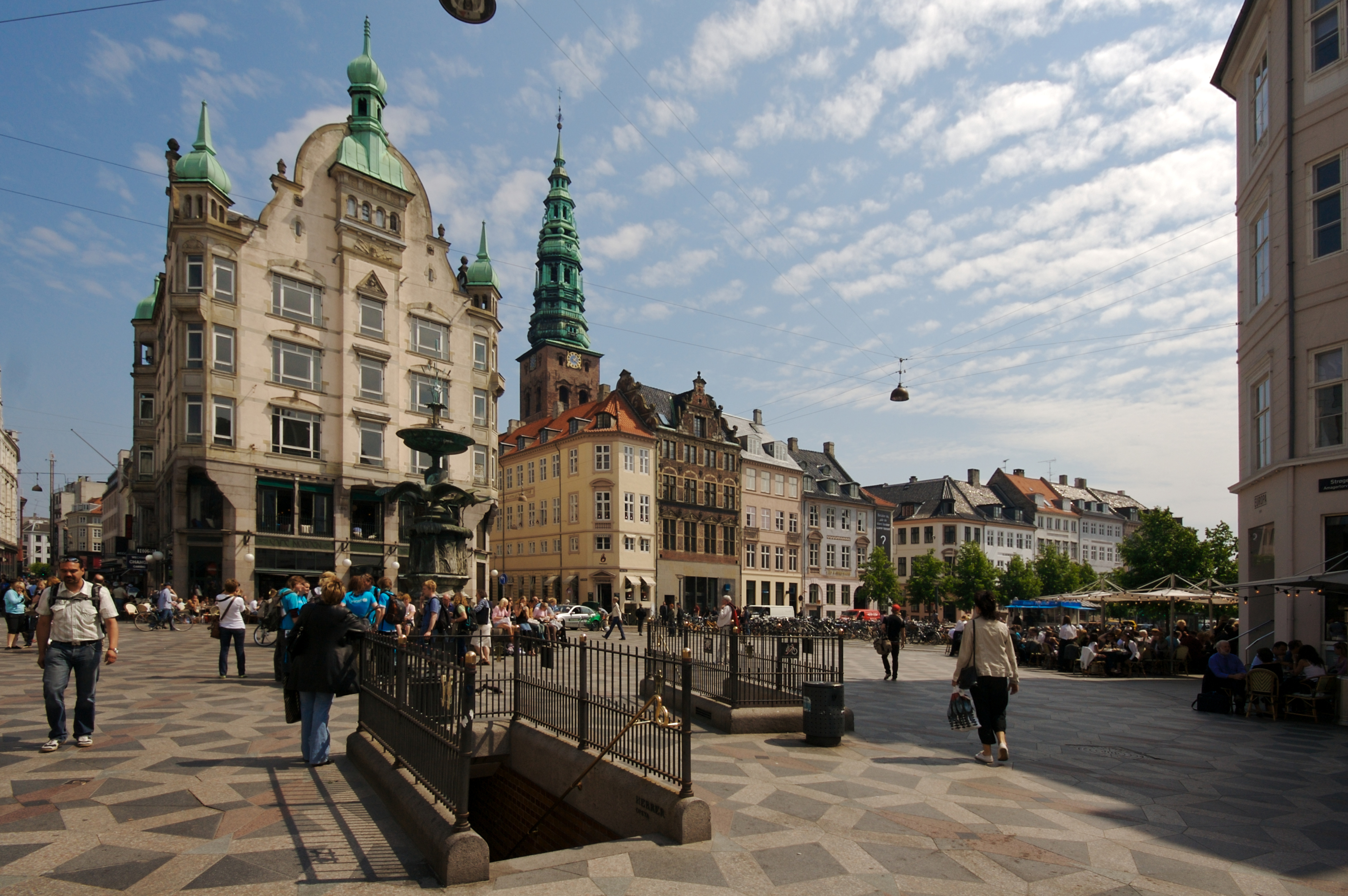
Strøget, Amagertorv

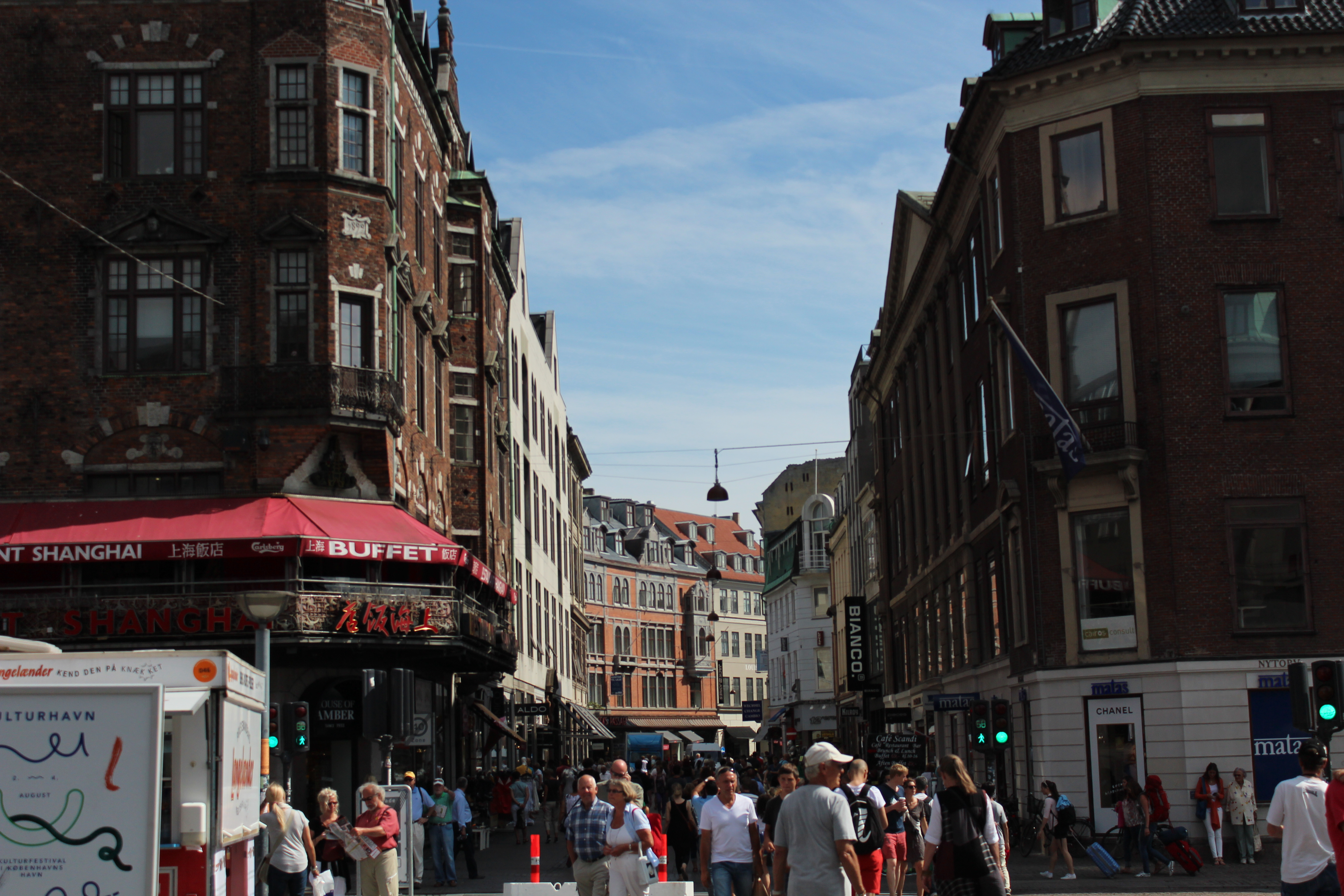
Strøget seen from Gammeltorv/Nytorv

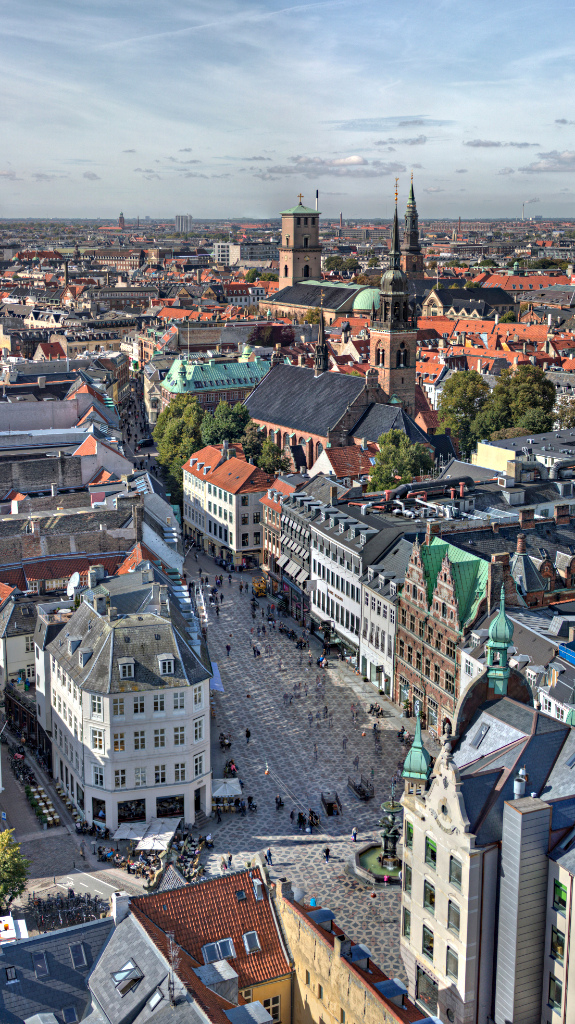
Aerial view of the street looking West

Strøget (Danish pronunciation: [ˈstʁʌjˀð̩]) is a pedestrian, car-free shopping area in Copenhagen, Denmark. This popular tourist attraction in the centre of town is one of the longest pedestrian shopping streets in Europe at 1.1 km. Located at the centre of the old city of Copenhagen, it has long been one of the most high-profile streets in the city.

== Geography ==
The main street is bound on the west by City Hall Square (Danish: Rådhuspladsen), the central town square by Copenhagen City Hall, and on the east by Kongens Nytorv ("The King's New Square"), another large square at the other end. But the Strøget area is actually a collection of streets that spread out from this central thoroughfare. Components of the pedestrianised network are:

- Frederiksberggade
- Gammel Torv / Nytorv
- Nygade
- Vimmelskaftet
- Fiolstræde
- Jorcks Passage
- Købmagergade (connects to Nørreport Station via Kultorvet)
- Amagertorv
- Østergade

== History ==
Strøget was known as Ruten until the late 19th century. This collection of streets has been at the heart of the city, and amongst the most fashionable in the city for much of its history. The layout of the streets comprising Strøget has been in place since 1728 when Frederiksberggade was laid out after a fire. Most of the buildings along the street date to the late 19th or early 20th centuries, with the oldest building dating to 1616.

Strøget was converted to a pedestrian zone on 17 November 1962 when cars were beginning to dominate Copenhagen's old central streets. Inspired by a number of new pedestrian streets created in Germany after the war, during the 1950s the street had closed to traffic for some of days at Christmas. The 1962 closure was initially a temporary trial, but the change was made permanent in 1964, and the road has remained closed since. The idea was controversial, some people believing that the Danes did not have the mentality for "public life" envisioned by such a street, and many local merchants believed the move would scare away business. The 'father' of a car free Strøget, Alfred Wassard, Copenhagen's 'mayor for town planning' from 1962 to 1978, even faced death threats. On the opening day, police officers were present to protect against assassination threats, and unhappy car drivers honked their horns on side streets to mark their displeasure although the event was well attended and marked by dancing and music. The posher shops on the east end of the street were particularly opposed to the change, and they tried to have the project restricted to its western portion which was dominated by bars and cinemas at the time.

However the project quickly proved a success, and the area soon boasted more shoppers, cafes, and a renewed street life. Building on Strøget's success, the network expanded piecemeal – another street and a few more squares were emptied of cars in 1968, and further closures took place in 1973, and 1992. From the initial 15,800 square metres of the Strøget, Copenhagen's central pedestrian network has expanded to about 100,000 square metres. In 1993 Amagertorv (Amager square) was re-surfaced in a pattern made of granite, designed by artist Bjørn Nørgaard. Nearby areas were also pedestrianised over the years, for example Nyhavn in 1980 and the town hall square (semi-pedestrianised) in 1996 on the occasion of Copenhagen being the European Capital of Culture (the through road was removed although bus traffic remained, and the square is still bounded by traffic).

== Influence ==
Architect Jan Gehl studied the new pedestrian area starting in 1962 and his influential reports and findings on the subject formed the basis of Copenhagen's subsequent broader policy shift toward emphasising pedestrians and bicycles. Gehl and Copenhagen's policies have later become influential around the world, encouraging cities such as Melbourne and New York to pedestrianise.

== Today ==
The street is often credited as the oldest and longest pedestrian street in the world; in fact neither claim is true, although it was the longest pedestrian street at the time of its conversion in 1962. Rue Sainte-Catherine in Bordeaux is longer, while Lijnbaan in Rotterdam was pedestrianised in 1953. And Laisvės Alėja in Kaunas, Lithuania is longer– stretching to 1.6 km. More recently, George Street in Sydney, extends to 2 km.

About 80,000 people use Strøget every day at the height of tourist season in summer, and about 48,000 do so on a winter's day. On the last Sunday before Christmas as many as 120,000 may use Strøget. Jan Gehl believes that Strøget is now roughly at its handling capacity on a summer's day, given its width at 10–12 metres and space for roughly 145 people/minute.

Many of the city's most famous and expensive stores are located along the strip, as well as some of the most famous and expensive luxury brand chain stores in the world. It also features a multitude of souvenir shops and fast food outlets.

The Lonely Planet travel guide noted as of 2014 that although Strøget is "a fun place to stroll," bustling with musicians and people, it seemed to be stagnating, "offering the same old international brand names" and "a scrappy mix of budget clothing stores, tourist shops and kebab houses." They advised that visitors should, "walk down it once, but after that you'll find the side streets far more productive in terms of independent shops and more interesting design."

== Transport ==
Many bus lines have stops close to the Strøget area, and at Kongens Nytorv is a Metro station. Also the S-train stations Vesterport and Nørreport are located nearby. (Nørreport is located very close to a pedestrian commercial street which leads to the "real" Strøget). Two metro stations opened on 29 September 2019 at City Hall Square and Gammel Strand. The latter one is located close to the middle of Strøget.

== See also ==
- Galleri K
- Tourism in Denmark
- Copenhagenization (bicycling)
- Østergade 13, Copenhagen
