= Diplomatic gift =

Ceremonial exchange of presents between heads of state and government officials

The Amarna letters (example pictured) record some of the earliest diplomatic gifts.

A diplomatic gift is a gift given by a diplomat, politician or leader when visiting a foreign country. Usually the gift is reciprocated by the host. The use of diplomatic gifts dates back to the ancient world and givers have competed to outdo each other in the lavishness of their gifts. Examples include silks given to the West by the Byzantines in the early Middle Ages, the luxury book, and panda diplomacy by the Chinese in the twentieth century.

The United States constitution forbids government officials from receiving gifts without the consent of Congress; diplomatic gifts are considered as given to the American people, and officials, including the president, must purchase them at market value. In the United States, the National Archives and Records Administration maintains gifts received.

== Middle Ages ==
In 757 Byzantine emperor Constantine V gave Pippin III of Francia a mechanical organ intended to indicate the superiority of Byzantine technology.

== Early modern diplomacy ==
=== Ottoman Empire ===
Gift giving was an important part of the culture of the Ottoman Empire and of British-Ottoman relations. Ottoman diplomatic practices were mainly geared towards establishing Ottoman superiority in any foreign relations, and the exchange of gifts reinforced that view of "universal empire" that governed the bombastic diplomatic rhetoric of the empire.

The memoirs of James Porter criticize the submission of the foreign ambassadors to Ottoman rulers:

"Whoever is acquainted with the Oriental practice, and knows the ostentation, pride, and haughtiness of the Turkish government, must know that they look upon, and consider such presents as actual tributes."

The role of gift giving in establishing diplomatic relations is seen in the Capitulations of the Ottoman Empire. First the queen sends gifts of tribute called pışkeşleri and with the acceptance of those gifts hedaya hayr-ı kabulda formal relations should be established. This culture was associated with corruption and bribery, and was essential to maintaining diplomatic relations. Baron Paget once said "If we can't find money to give the ministers their usual presents ... we who have ever passed with an esteem superior to all other nations shall make ourselves the most contemptible." Similar observations were made by Henry Grenville:

"money is the supreme mover of all measures in this corrupt, irregular, ill-conducted government; however that might reflect upon a Christian state, it carries no infamy with it here."

=== England and Scotland ===
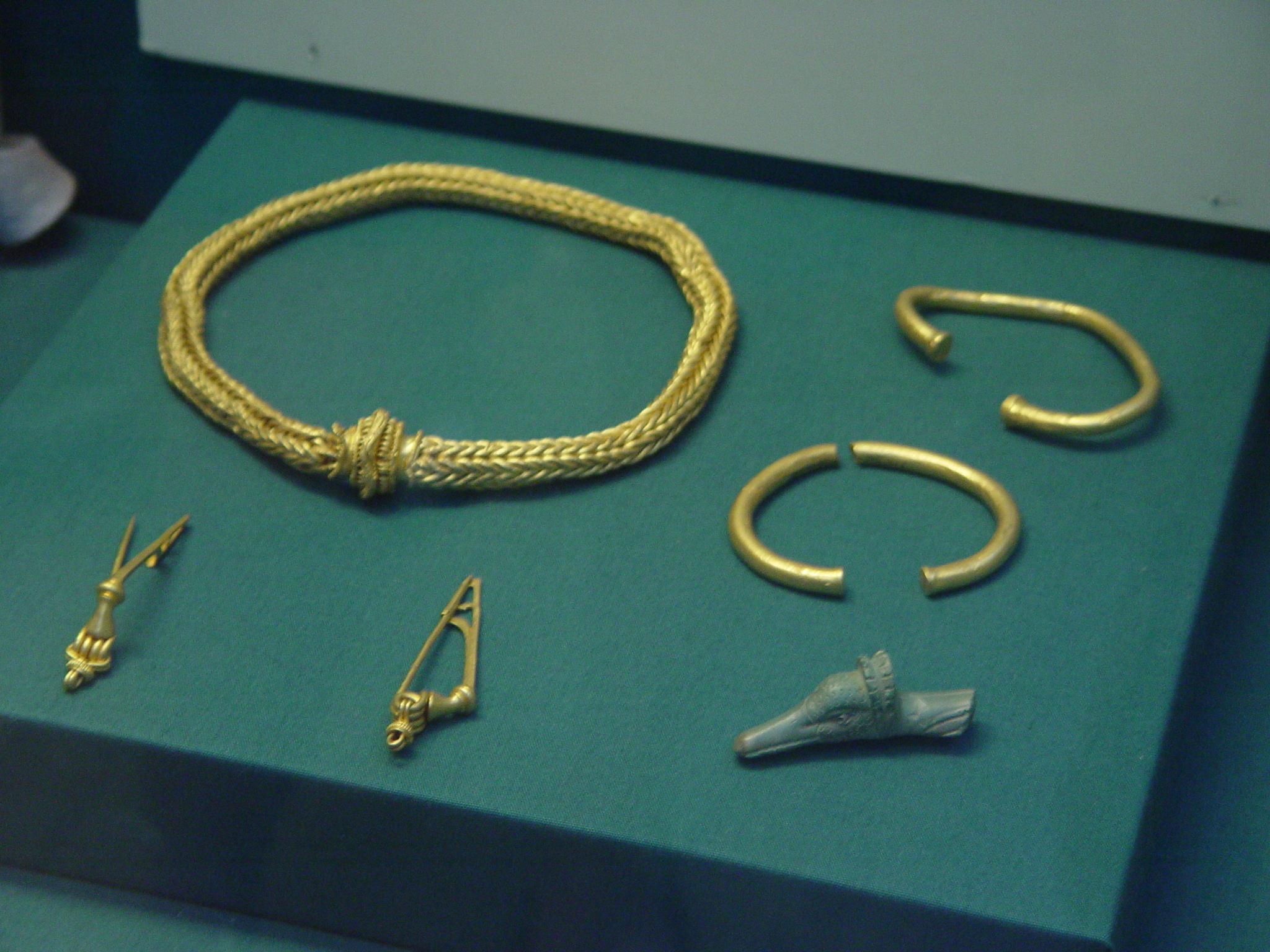
The Winchester Hoard (Iron Age) may have been a diplomatic gift.

When King James VI of Scotland intended to give Francis Walsingham a diamond ring as a diplomatic gift in 1583, the Earl of Arran, a dominant court favourite, substituted a ring set with a worthless crystal.

When Anne of Denmark came to Scotland in May 1590 as the king's bride, she was accompanied by diplomats who attended her coronation and assessed the value of the lands and palaces granted to her by James VI. The goldsmith Thomas Foulis provided gold chains as diplomatic gifts for Peder Munk and the other Danish envoys. Foulis made four gold chains for ambassadors attending the baptism of Prince Henry in 1594, those given to Christian Bernekow and Steen Bille of Denmark were heavier and more costly than those given to Adam Crusius from Brunswick and Joachim von Bassewitz from Mecklenburg.

Diplomats brought gifts from the monarchs they represented, and were typically given presents for themselves when they left, often at an audience ceremony known as "taking leave". A French ambassador at the court of James VI and I, Christophe de Harlay, Count of Beaumont, was rumoured to have caused offence by unexpectedly requesting valuable gifts. John Chamberlain wrote that Beaumont had blotted his reputation by "mechanicall tricks" when he left England, by asking for a greater gift of silver plate, receiving two horses and "pictures great and small with jewells", with gifts from English noblemen of his acquaintance. By "mechanical", Chamberlain means conduct unworthy of the diplomatic class.

Exchequer records give some detail of the gifts given to Beaumont. The goldsmiths William Herrick and Arnold Lulls were paid £459 in October 1606 for "two pictures of gold set with stone" which Anne of Denmark had given to Beaumont and his wife Anne Rabot, the portrait miniatures mentioned by Chamberlain. Sir Robert Cecil gave Beaumont portraits of himself and his father William Cecil painted by John de Critz which cost him £8.

A Spanish ambassador involved in the negotiations for the Treaty of London in 1604, Juan Fernández de Velasco, Constable of Castile, commissioned jewels in Antwerp as gifts to distribute at the English court. Against the current custom in Antwerp he tried to buy the jewellery on a sale-or-return basis and was flatly refused. Velasco gave jewels to prominent figures in the household of Anne of Denmark who seemed likely to promote the Catholic cause. Lady Anna Hay received a gold anchor studded with 39 diamonds, and Jean Drummond an aigrette or feather jewel studded with 75 diamonds, both pieces supplied by a Brussels jeweller Jean Guiset.

During his time in London, in August 1604, Velasco gave Prince Henry a Spanish horse and an embroidered doublet and sash. He presented a crystal and gilt cup to Anne of Denmark during a banquet. King James gave him a vintage service of gilt plate, and Anne of Denmark gave him diamond-set locket with miniature portraits of herself and the king, which cost £1000, with a pearl stomacher or necklace, for his wife, described as a garganto in Spanish.

== Nineteenth century ==
After the Congress of Vienna (1814–15), Rundell, Bridge, and Rundell, goldsmiths to the British royal family and government, prepared 22 snuff-boxes to a value of 1000 guineas each to be given as diplomatic gifts.

In the mid 19th century, the Chinese diplomat Qiying gifted intimate portraits of himself to representatives from Italy, Great Britain, the United States, and France as part of treaty negotiations with the West over control of land and trade in China after the First Opium War.

== Twentieth century ==
When he was the US Secretary of State, James Baker accepted a shotgun from the Foreign Minister of the Soviet Union, Eduard Shevardnadze.

== Missteps ==
Diplomatic gifts have the potential to seal international friendships, but also to be rebuffed, to seem mismatched, or to accidentally send the wrong message. In 2006 Taiwan rejected the People's Republic of China's offer of a panda. A 2012 gift of a "British" table tennis table to President Obama seemed ideal until it was revealed that it was designed in Britain but made in China, evoking worries about the decline of British manufacturing industry. Another example, occurred in 2015 in Taiwan, where clash of culture symbolism occurred between a British minister and the Taipei Mayor, where giving watches or clocks have different symbolic meanings in UK and Chinese cultures, where the former is more positive and latter is more negative.

== Gallery ==
Diplomatic gifts take diverse forms:

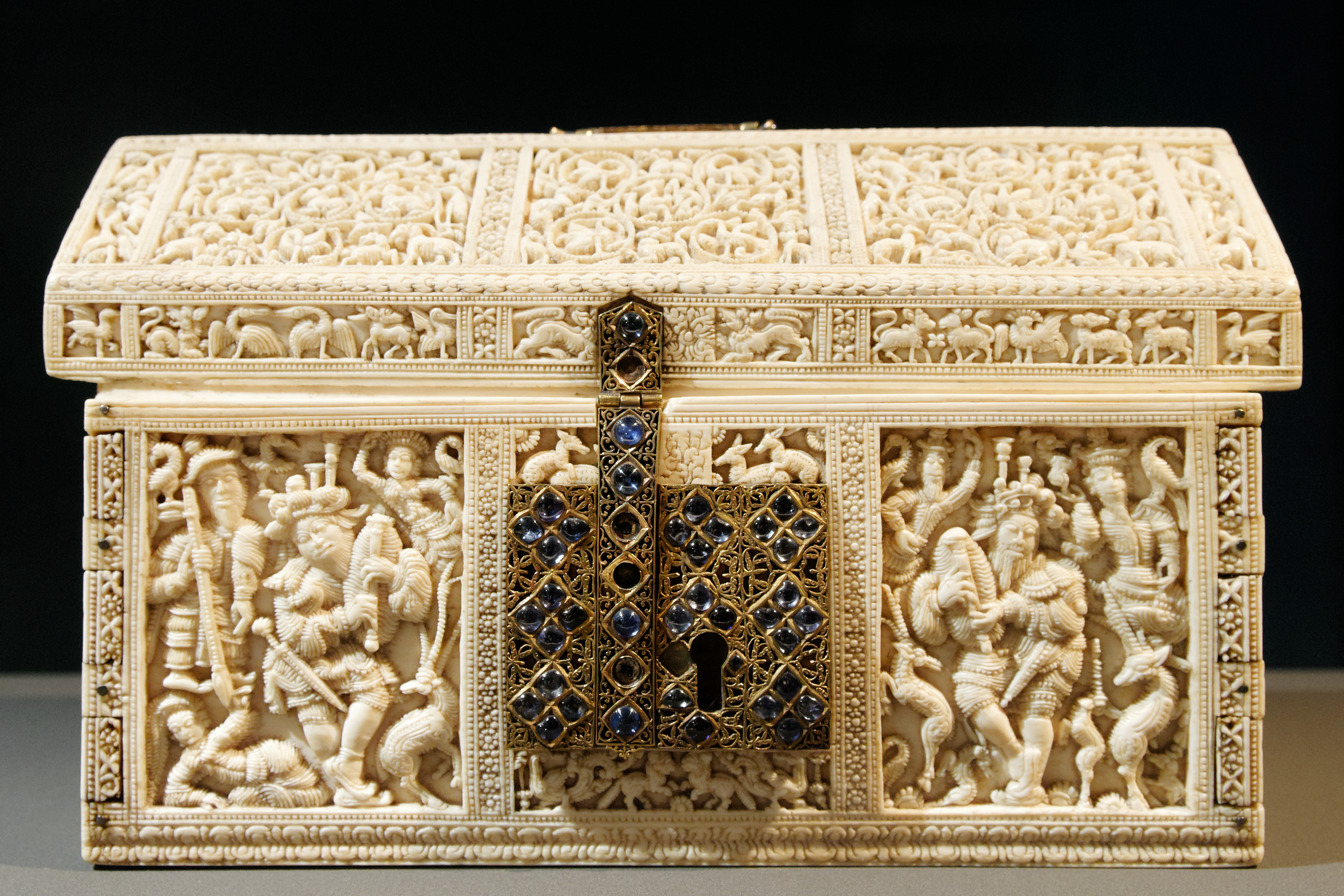
Casket with Sinhalese and Christian imagery. A gift from the King of Kotte to the King of Portugal, c. 1557.

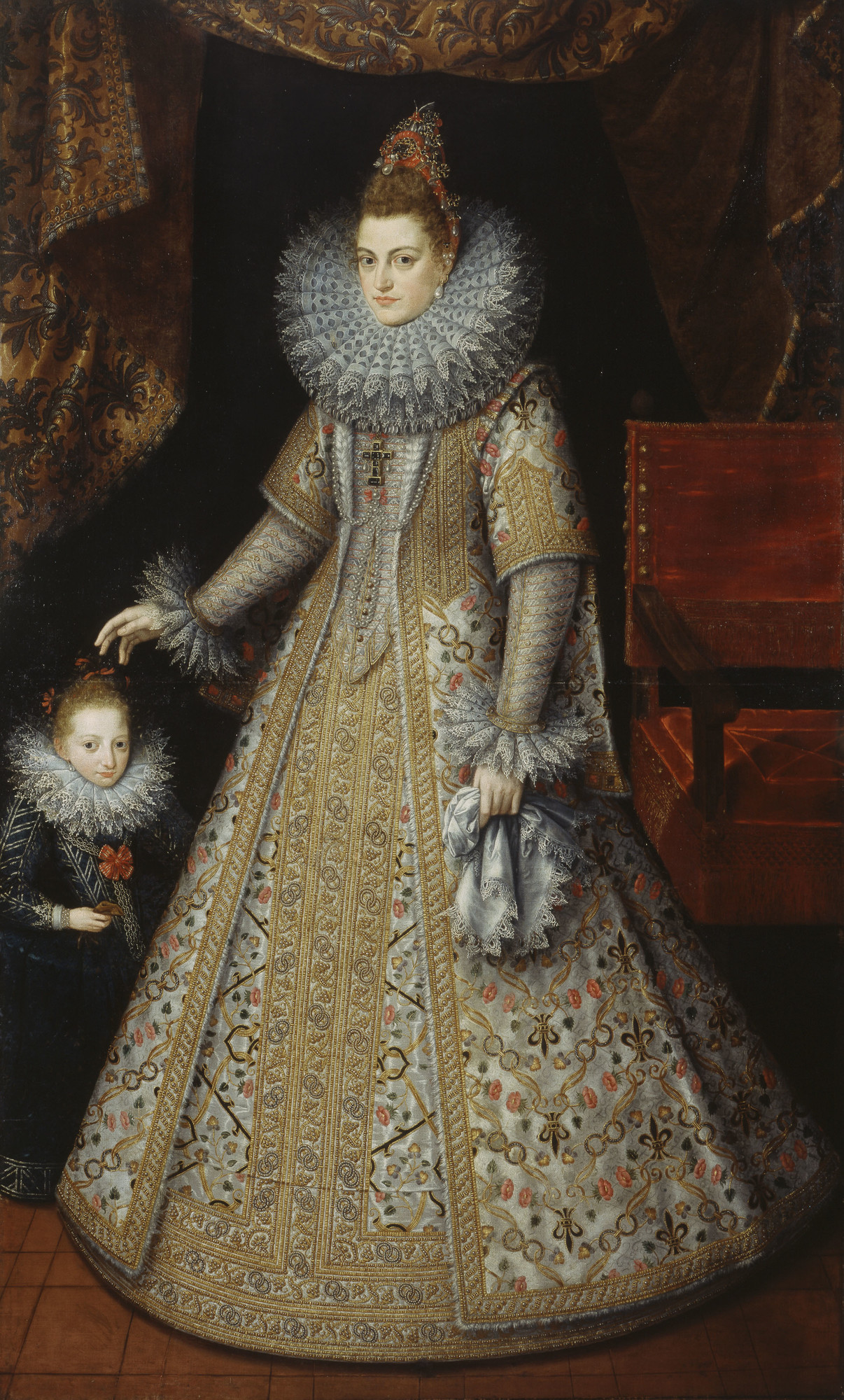
The Infanta Isabella Clara Eugenia, Archduchess of Austria, pictured together with her dwarf by Frans Pourbus the younger. A gift to James VI of Scotland, 1603.

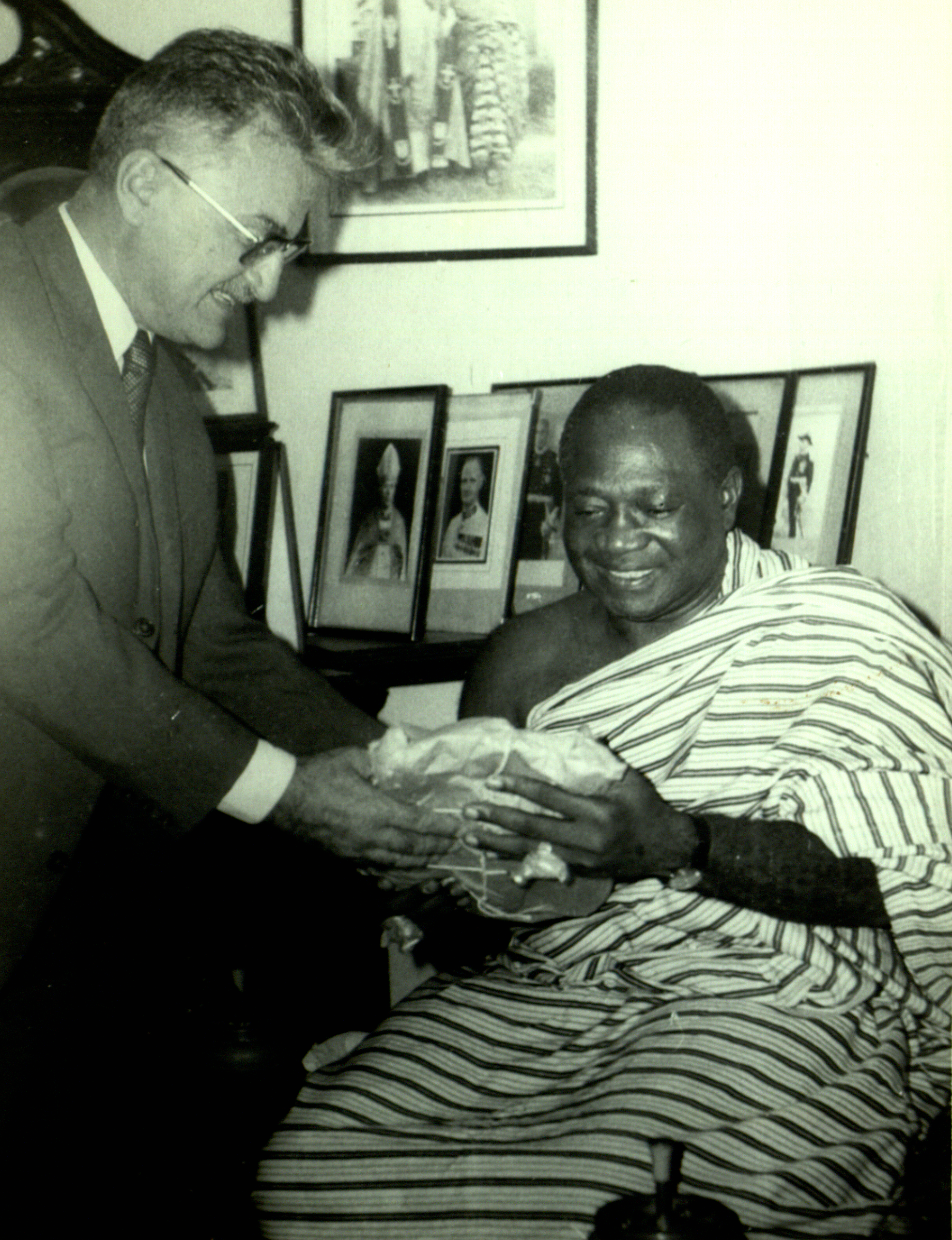
The Ambassador of Yugoslavia, Zdravko Pečar, presenting a diplomatic gift in his host country.

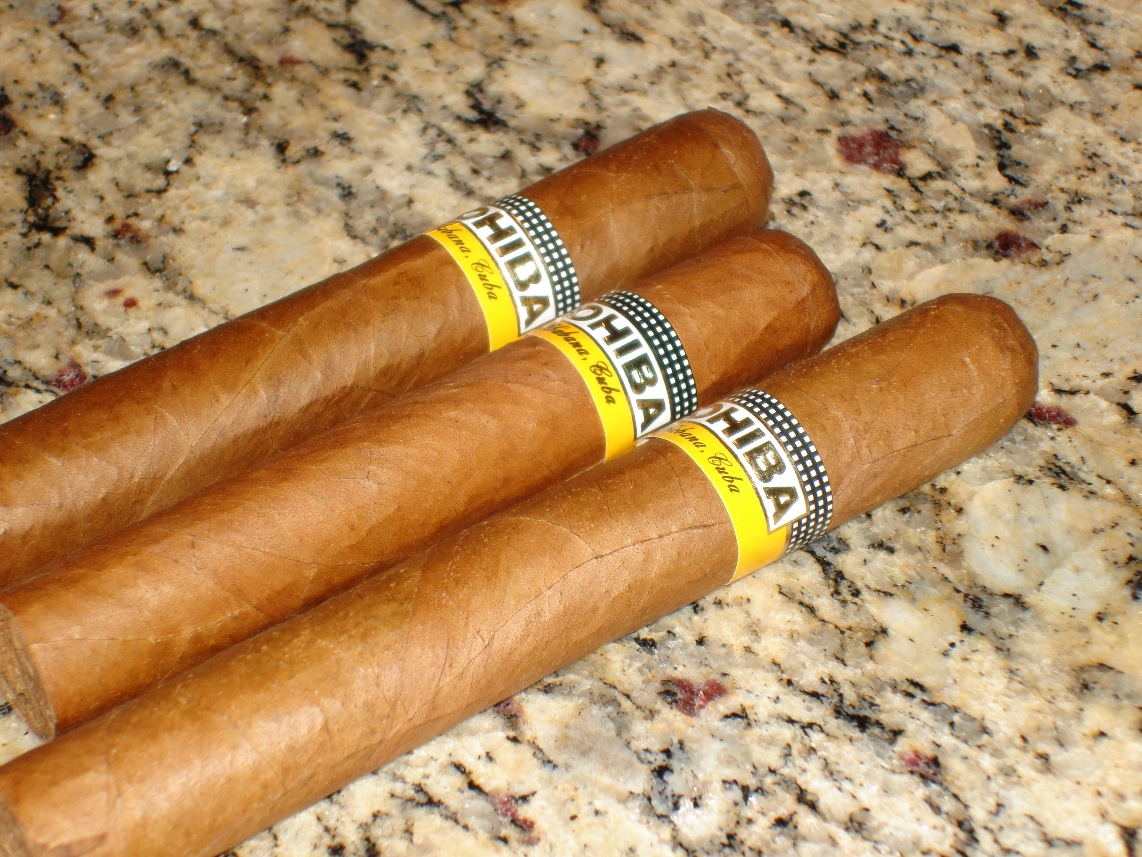
Cohiba cigars were often used as diplomatic gifts by Fidel Castro's Cuba.

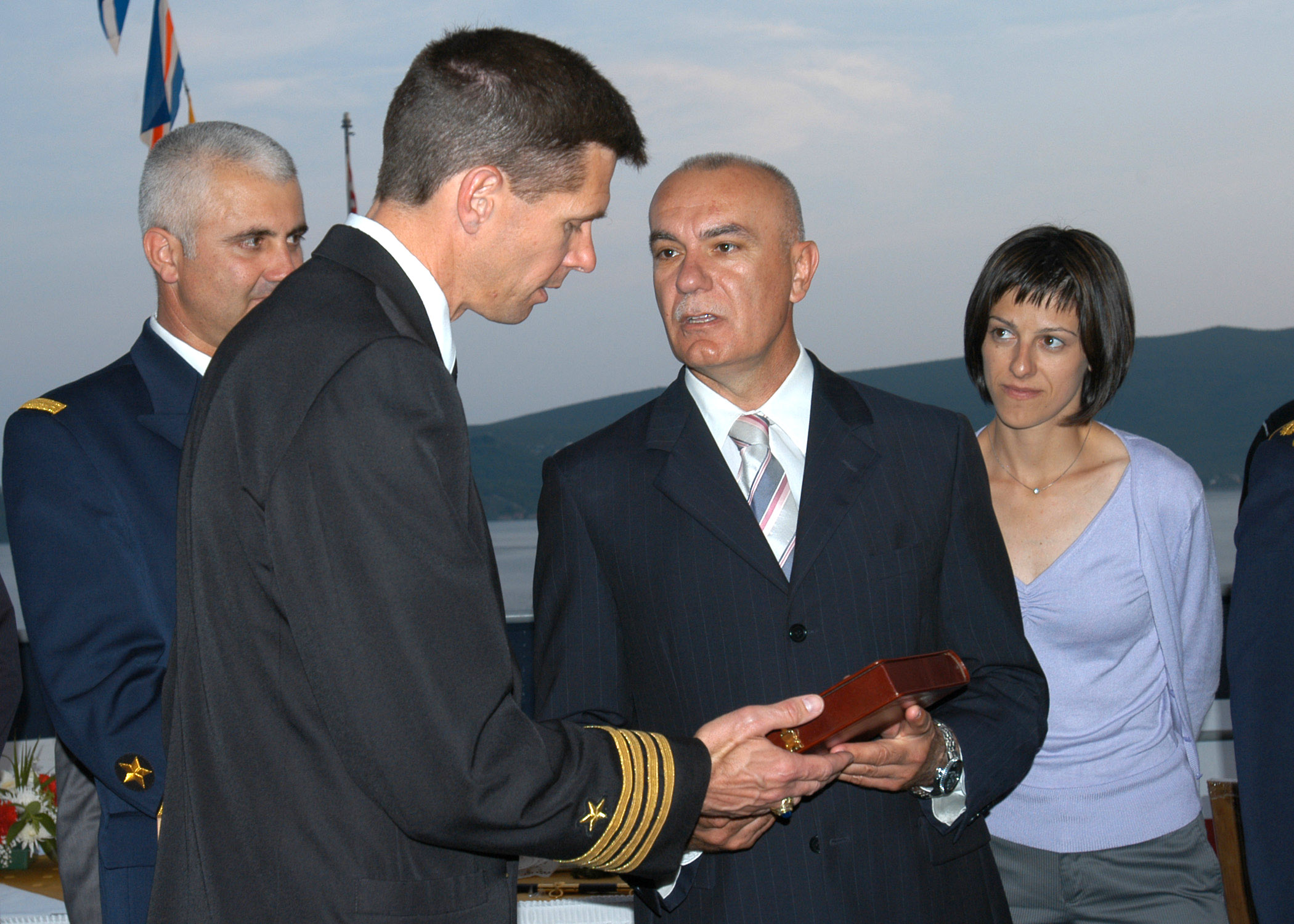
The Montenegro Minister of Defense and a U.S. Navy officer exchange gifts in 2007 during a reception to mark the first year of Montenegro's independence.
