= Fajr International Handicrafts and Traditional Arts Festival =

Annual arts and culture event held in Tehran, Iran

Fajr International Handicrafts and Traditional Arts Festival جشنواره بین‌المللی صنایع دستی و هنرهای سنتی فجر
- Frequency: Annually
- Location: Tehran
- Country: Iran
- Years active: 2017-present
- Inaugurated: February 2017
- Founder: Ministry of Cultural Heritage, Tourism and Handicrafts
- Most recent: 20-24 February 2025

The Fajr International Handicrafts and Traditional Arts Festival (جشنواره بین‌المللی صنایع دستی و هنرهای سنتی فجر), also known by its Persian stylization Sarv-e-Simin (Persian: سروِ سیمین, lit. 'Silver Cypress'), is an annual arts and culture event held in Tehran, Iran. Organized by the Ministry of Cultural Heritage, Tourism and Handicrafts, the festival brings together artisans, craftspeople, and designers from across Iran and around the world to exhibit, compete, and celebrate traditional arts and crafts under a variety of categories.

The festival is usually held in late February, with the 9th edition held from 20 to 24 February 2025. Artisans from all 31 Iranian provinces participate, and recent editions have attracted thousands of submissions, including hundreds of international entries. The competition format involves submission, evaluation by juries, and exhibitions of selected works; alongside these are marketplace events, diplomatic gift exhibitions, and workshops and related side events. The festival is described by officials as both a showcase of craftsmanship and an instrument of cultural diplomacy and economic development.

The roots of the Fajr Handicrafts Festival trace back to a decision in 2015 by the Ministry of Cultural Heritage, Tourism and Handicrafts to more fully integrate traditional crafts and arts into the broader ‘Fajr’ festival series. Its inaugural edition was held in February 2017 at the Iranian Artists’ Forum. Since then, the event has grown steadily in scale, prestige, and international reach. The current edition, the 9th, represents a landmark in participation: over 7,500 works submitted, involvement from 20 countries, and a heightened focus on themes such as “Consensus and Cultural Diversity”.
