= Falk Lykke =

Danish nobleman (1583–1650)

The King of Denmark's Lensmand of Christianopel len
- In office 1612–1625

The King of Denmark's Lensmand of Visborg len
- In office 1625–1627

The King of Denmark's Lensmand of St. Peter's Priory, Lund
- In office 1627–1650

Personal details
- Born: 2 January 1583 Odense, Denmark
- Died: 7 July 1650 (aged 67) Copenhagen, Denmark
- Spouse: Christine Frantzdatter Rantzau
- Awards: Knight of the Elephant (1648)

Military service
- Branch/service: Danish Army
- Years of service: 1611-1612; 1625-1647
- Rank: Colonel
- Unit: Scanian Regiment
- Battles/wars: Kalmar War; Torstenson War

Falk Lykke (2 January 1583 – 7 July 1650) was a Danish nobleman, fief-holder, Colonel of the Scanian Regiment, and Knight of the Elephant.

Lykke participated in the Kalmar War as captain in Gert Rantzau's regiment of foot, receiving Christianopel as a fief after the war. This he in 1625 exchanged for Visborg which meant he was in-charge of the whole island of Gotland; in its turn exchanged for St. Peter's Priory in Lund two years later. Lykke was a representative of the nobility of Skåne at several Diets. After the death of Anders Sincklar in 1625, Lykke became colonel of the Scanian Regiment. During the Torstenson War he and his regiment were stationed in Elsinore; a period characterized by severe conflicts between him and the local citizenry. After that war, Lykke resigned from his colonelcy, but was rewarded with a knighthood.

Lykke was married to Kristine Rantzau. He held Skovgård in Jutland, and Bollerup, Kronovall and Gersnæs in Skåne, in allodial possession.
