= Sinclairsholm Castle =

Castle in Hässleholm Municipality, Scania, in southern Sweden

- Sinclairsholms slott
- Hässleholm Municipality
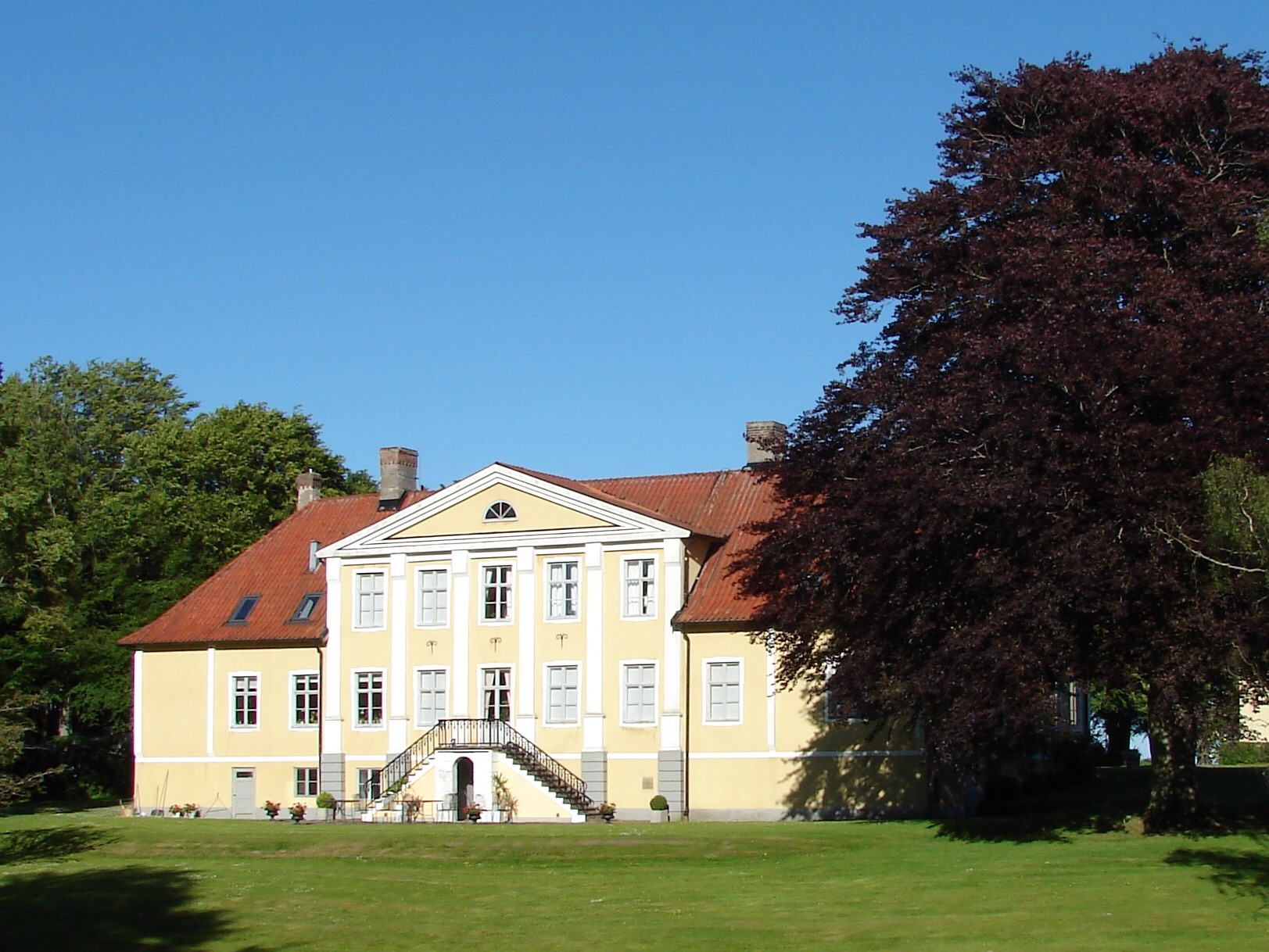
- Sinclairsholm Castle

Site information
- Type: Castle
- Open to the public: By appointment

Location
- Scania, Sweden
- Location within Skåne
- Coordinates: 56.175°N 13.9725°E

Site history
- Built: 1733

Sinclairsholm Castle (Swedish: Sinclairsholms slott) is a castle in Hässleholm Municipality, Scania, in southern Sweden. It was built by the Danish privy counsellor Andrew Sinclair.

== History ==
The estate was founded in the beginning of the 17th century by the county governor at Landskrona Castle, the Danish privy counsellor Andrew Sinclair. In 1620 he made an exchange for the parsonage which became the site for the construction of the house, which according to the inscription above the door was completed in 1626. Anders Sinclair, however, never saw the house complete as he died in 1625 and his son Kristian Sinclair took over. The estate then came to belong to Jochum Beck at Torup (probably through purchase), Jörgen Marsvin, county governor Håkan Nilsson Skytte, within whose family it remained until 1808. It has since been owned by the Gyllenkrook family. Via Baroness Eva Barnekow, born Gyllenkrook, the estate came to the Barnekow family, and is today owned by Baron Johan Barnekow.

Carl Linnaeus visited the castle between May 17-19 during his Scania trip in 1749. The owner was then Major Carl Henrik Skytte.

== See also ==
- List of castles in Sweden
