= Skovgårde Voldsted =

Ancient monument in Norddjurs Municipality, Denmark

Coordinates: 56.5078°N 10.5344°E

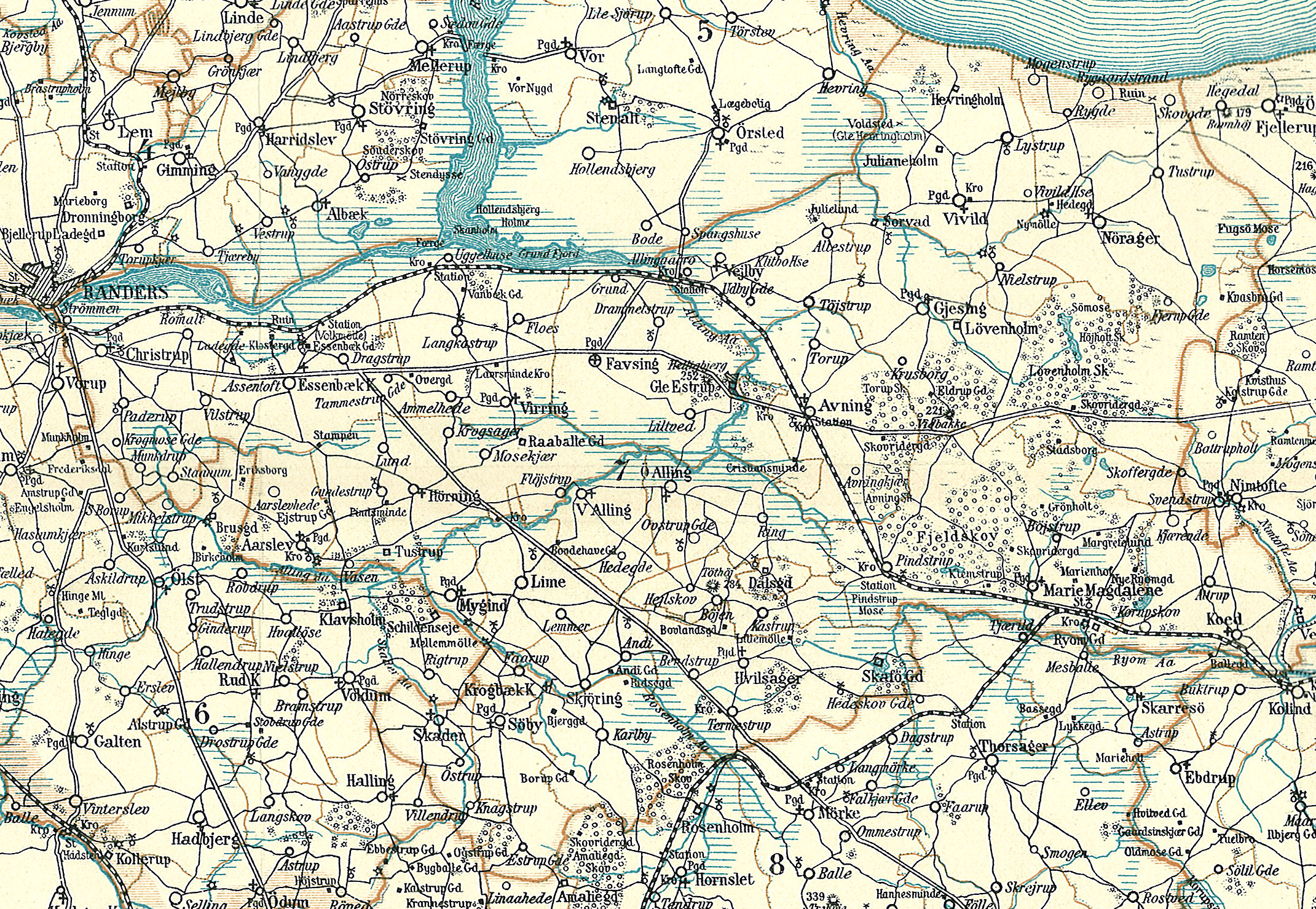
Situation of Skovgårde Voldsted in Sønderhald Hundred; northeast corner of the map, almost by the sea: a village Skovgde (Skovgårde), a short distance west-north-west of it, an X, and the text "Ruin".

Skovgårde Voldsted is an ancient monument in Nørager Parish, Norddjurs Municipality, Denmark. The site contains the archaeological remains of the old Skovgård Manor.

== History ==
In the late 15th century Skovgård manor was owned by Jens Madsen Munk of Viborg (died ~1501). His daughter Ellen (died after 1511) was married to Hans Lykke on the nearby manor of Rugaard, and through her the manor came into possession of the Lykke family. Lady Ellen held Skovgård as a widow, but then it was inherited by her son Erik Lykke (dead before 1536). During her grandson's, Erik Eriksen Lykke, ownership, Skovgård burned down in 1541, but was later rebuilt. Erik Lykke junior's son Falk Lykke, sold it in 1619 to Dorotea Juul (died 1644), widow of Jørgen Kaas, and through her the manor came to her nephew Captain Hans Juul (died 1697) , who sold it in 1648 to Just Høeg (died 1649). In a few years Skovgård then changed hands several times, before it came into the possession of Otto Kruse (died 1699), who joined it with the manor Østergård in the nearby Fjellerup parish. The two manors were then conjoined as a production unit until 1789, after which it has been a small hamlet, Skovgårde, with originally three farmsteads. The archaeological site became a protected ancient monument in 1884.

== Archaeological remains ==
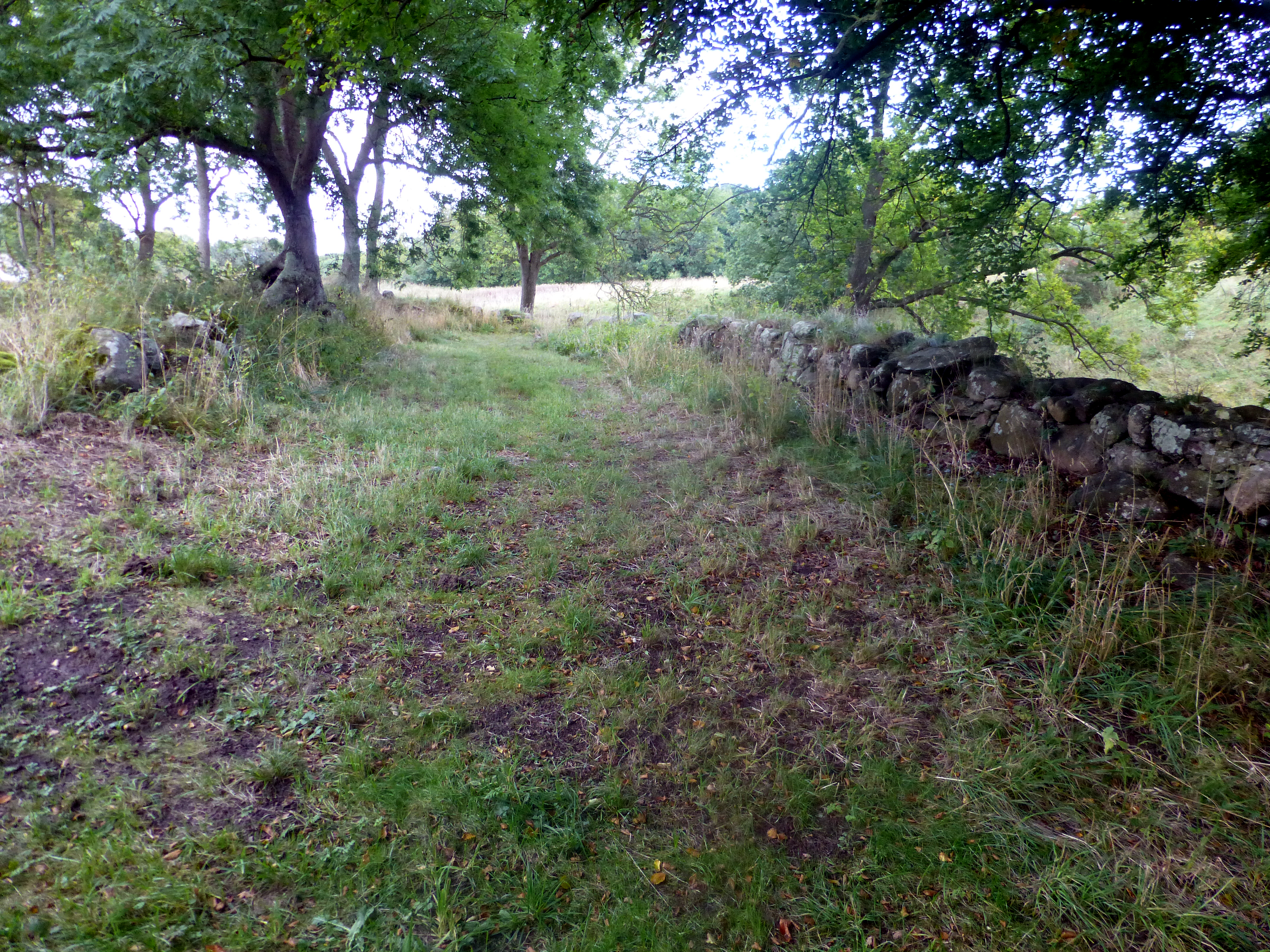
Skovgårde Voldsted, south wing seen from the west.

The remains of the manor consist of a rectangular embankment of 70 meters x 43 meters, with protruding stonework bastions in the corners, raised about 3.5 meters over a now drained moat. There is paving, and foundation remains of a three-winged building; in the south wing made of bricks, with a height of up to two meters.
