= Scanian Regiment =

- Skaanske regiment
- Active: 1614–1658
- Disbanded: 1658
- Country: Denmark
- Branch: Royal Danish Army
- Type: Regiment
- Role: Foot
- Size: Ten companies first; then five
- Part of: National Army
- Engagements: Thirty Years' War; Dano-Swedish War (1657–58)

Commanders
- First colonel: Andrew Sinclair 1615-1625
- Notable commanders: Falk Lykke 1625-1646; Wulff Hieronymus von Kratz 1646-1658

Scanian Regiment (Danish: Det Skaanske regiment), was a Danish national infantry regiment 1615–1658. It was raised among the peasantry in Skåneland to augment the mercenary army, and fought against Habsburg during the Thirty Years' War and against Sweden in 1657–1658. When Skåne was ceded to Sweden in 1658, it was disbanded.

== Background ==
During the sixteenth and early seventeenth century, the Danish infantry consisted almost entirely of German mercenaries, enlisted in time of war, and dismissed after the end of hostilities. A standing army was out of the question; the Diet and Council would not allow it, for fear of strengthening royal power, and the Treasury could not afford it. Denmark had treaties with all the German states, Poland, and the Dutch republic, allowing recruiting for the Danish army on their territories.

== National army ==
In 1614, the King and Council decided to create a permanent national army, to augment the war-time mercenary army. Four thousand soldiers would be raised from the peasantry; 2,000 in Jutland, 200 in Funen, 200 in Zealand, and 1,600 in Skåne, Halland, and Blekinge. At first the basis for recruitment was crown land; the tenant of a crown farmstead had either to be a soldier himself, or keep a suitable man, against freedom from taxation. In 1620, all land - most land in Denmark was owned by the nobility - was required to hold soldiers; nine farmsteads keeping one soldier, who had to serve for three years; the soldiers only serving under the colours in time of war; the weaponry kept at armouries by the churches. Two grand regiments of foot were created; the Jutland, and the Skåne: the soldiers from Funen going to the former, those from Zealand, to the latter. Captains and lieutenants where selected from half-pay officers of the Kalmar War; ensigns and sergeants from well to do tenants. In 1633 the number of regiments were raised to three; in addition to the two oldest, a Zealand regiment was also created, the predecessor of today's Sjællandske Livregiment.

== The Regiment ==
The Scanian regiment was mustered into service on 20 December 1615, with Andrew Sinclair as colonel. At first the regiment contained 1,792 soldiers, with one company from Zealand, four from Skåne, three from Halland, and one from Blekinge. When the Zealand regiment was created it lost one company, and when Halland was ceded to Sweden through the peace of Brömsebro 1645, another three. The regiment was mobilized 1627–1639, during the Thirty Years' War, when Imperial forces attacked Denmark. When Frederick III decided to attack Sweden in 1657, the Skåne regiment had, as all national regiments, untrained soldiers and officers not used to command. After the disastrous war, Skåne and Blekinge were ceded to Sweden, and the regiment disbanded.
