= Walter Dundas =

Laird of Over Newliston

Walter Dundas (died 1636) was a Scottish landowner and courtier.

He was the eldest son of George Dundas of Dundas and Margaret Boswell, a sister of John Boswell of Balmuto. Walter Dundas was Laird of Over Newliston, and he later inherited Dundas Castle.

He attended the University of St Andrews in the 1570s and was literate in Latin and French as well as Scots. His father wrote to him in July 1588 describing the wedding of Henrietta Stewart and the bejewelled appearance of Francis Stewart, 5th Earl of Bothwell.

Walter Dundas was knighted at the baptism of Prince Henry at Stirling Castle in August 1594. It is said that James VI asked him to bring silver spoons and lend him a pair of silk stockings (these requests were made to the Earl of Mar). James VI sent him an invitation to the baptism of Prince Charles in December 1600 at Holyrood House, asking for venison, wild meat, "brissel foulis", and capons.

At Linlithgow Palace there was a private stair leading to the king's apartments. Walter Dundas encountered the queen, Anne of Denmark, on the stair way in the dark without recognising her, and mentioned this to James VI. The king recognised his wife from his description and ordered him not to use the route in future.

He inherited the Dundas estate in 1598 and, over succeeding decades he dedicated substantial resources to enhancing it both economically and aesthetically, building a new residential block beside the medieval tower and adding a walled garden with corner pavilions and a central fountain and sundial. He experimented in the construction of enclosed fields and exploited the limestone on his property, constructing lime kilns to process it for use on his own land to increase crop yields and to sell to neighbouring estates.

He frequently represented Linlithgowshire (West Lothian) in parliament, served on a number of parliamentary commissions, and as sheriff of the county. He appears to have favoured presbyterianism over episcopacy, providing financial support to six ministers imprisoned in Blackness Castle for treason in 1605 and voting against the controversial Five Articles of Perth in the parliament of 1621.

He died in January 1636 with net assets of over £21,000 Scots, including £5,000 in cash, owing almost nothing to creditors.

== Marriages and family ==
He married Janet Oliphant, a daughter of Alexander Oliphant of Kellie. Their children included:

- Elizabeth Dundas, who married James Dundas of Newliston
- Margaret Dundas, who married William Scharpe of Pitleckie
- Isobel Dundas, who married John Sandilands, Lord Torphichen

His second wife was Anne or Annas Monteith. Their children included:

- George Dundas of Dundas
- William Dundas
- Walter Dundas
- Alexander Dundas
- Marion Dundas
