= Masque at the baptism of Prince Henry =

1594 celebration at Stirling Castle, Scotland

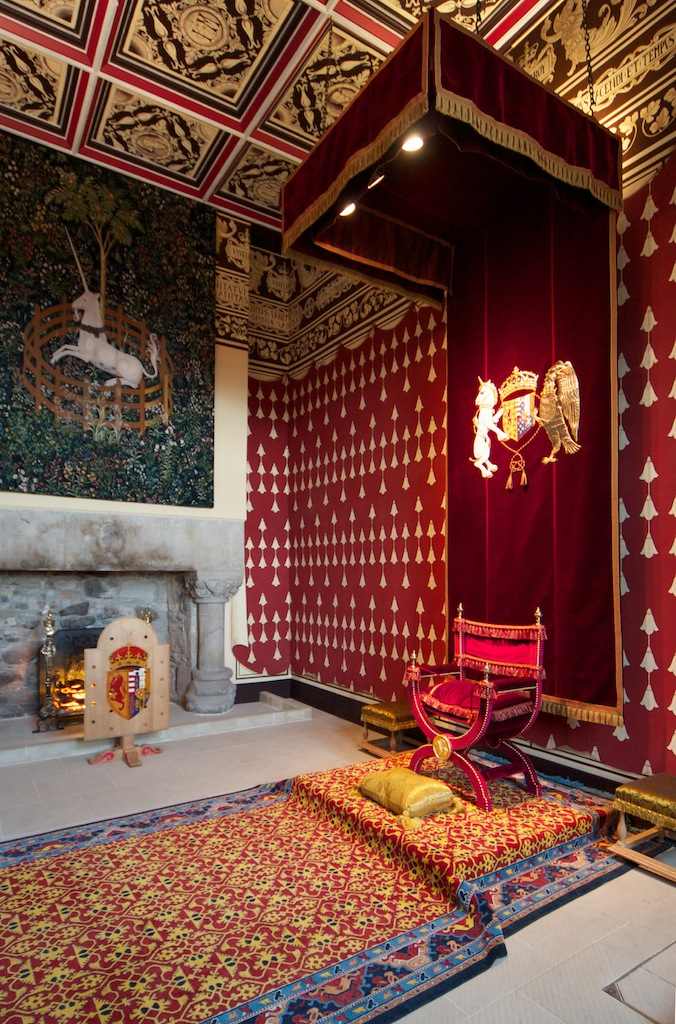
The Queen's Inner Hall, from which Robert Radclyffe, 5th Earl of Sussex carried Prince Henry to the Chapel Royal to be baptised

A masque was held at the baptism of Prince Henry Frederick, heir apparent of James VI of Scotland, on 30 August 1594 at Stirling Castle. It was written by the Scottish poet William Fowler and Patrick Leslie, 1st Lord Lindores.

Prince Henry, born 19 February 1594, was the first child of James VI and his Queen, Anne of Denmark. Henry was heir apparent to the throne of Scotland and potentially in line to the thrones of England and Ireland. William Fowler composed the masque and wrote an account of the celebrations in A True Reportarie of the Baptisme of the Prince of Scotland (1594) printed in Edinburgh and London. An English spectator also made a report of the events. The programme owed much to French Valois court festival, while some aspects were attuned to please English audiences and readers of Fowler's book. There was a tournament in exotic costume and a masque during which desserts were served, while Latin mottoes were displayed and verses sung to music. A maritime theme involving a ship laden with fish made of sugar represented the safe sea crossing made in 1590 by Anne of Denmark and James, the North Star, despite the "conspiracies of witches". The ship was said to be the king's "own invention". James VI was celebrated as a "new Jason", and by analogy, Anne of Denmark was Medea and also both the Golden Fleece and the embodiment of her dowry. The event was delayed by waiting for the completion of the new Chapel Royal designed by William Schaw and described as the new Temple of Solomon, and the arrival of the English ambassador's party.

== Preparations ==
Orders were given to repair the palace at Stirling Castle in December 1593 for the pregnant queen. Some courtiers argued that Edinburgh Castle, where James VI was born, was a more safe and secure place. The English ambassador Robert Bowes reported:

Order is given by the King and Council that the house at Sterlinge (presently in decay and ruin) shall be repaired and made ready for the Queen to be there delivered of her Chylde, The Queen hath good lykinge to be at Sterlinge, and purposes to remove towards it on the 27th instant. But some principal officers and courtiers, remembering the many enterprises executed at Sterlinge and fearing like events to succeed in that place, are seeking means to stay the Queen's remove thither and to allure her to the Castle in Edinburgh.

Anne went to Stirling, conveyed by the Earl of Morton, at first she was lodged at Argyll's Lodging and then Mar's Wark, a house belonging to the Countess of Mar, until the castle was ready. She lodged in the newly repaired palace which had been built by James V. Prince Henry was born on 19 February 1594 and there were widespread celebrations and bonfires. James VI wrote to Elizabeth I asking her to be a godmother. He sent Peter Young to Anne's grandfather, the Duke of Mecklenburg, claiming by way of compliment that the baby resembled the late Frederick II of Denmark. Young also carried Anne's letter announcing the birth to her brother-in-law Henry Julius, Duke of Brunswick-Lüneburg and Elizabeth of Denmark. New clothes were bought for King James' old nurse Helen Littil, and her two daughters Grissel and Sara Gray, who were to be guests at the baptism.

The ambassadors from the relatives of Anna of Denmark arrived at Leith on 12 and 13 July 1594. She left Edinburgh for Falkland Palace to avoid receiving them because Holyrood Palace was not magnificent enough. James VI sent some invitations on 21 July, saying that the event would be on 8 or 9 August "at the fardest". But it was said that the building of the "great Temple of Solomon", the Chapel Royal at Stirling, was not complete. The events were postponed until Stirling Castle was ready, and the English ambassador arrived, on 28 August. Timber for Stirling was bought at Leith in May by the master wright, James Murray. There are no building accounts for the preparations.

John Colville reported a rumour in July that James VI had conceived a jealousy against Anne of Denmark, and even thought the Duke of Lennox might be the father of Prince Henry. James was beginning to regret the expense of the preparations. There were fears that the Catholic lords might try to kidnap Prince Henry. Some spoke of Stirling as an unlucky place and an old Latin saying "Sterling ab initio nequam" (Stirling, wicked from the beginning). A part of this phrase was said to be carved on an old quern-stone kept at the castle.

Anne of Denmark, according to the letters of John Carey, an English officer at Berwick, had made a truce with the rebel Earl of Bothwell that he would do nothing until after the baptism. Carey also wrote that the Danish and Brunswick ambassadors were "every day almost drunk". The report of the Dutch ambassadors Brederode and Valck mentions dinners at Stirling Castle in the days before the baptism, a hunt in the park, and James VI dancing in the Great Hall.

Brederode and Valck described a meeting with the other ambassadors at the castle to discuss the naming of the prince, which was traditional and customary for godfathers. According to their account, the name "Henry Frederick" was chosen to allude to the late Frederick II of Denmark and Henry Julius, Duke of Brunswick-Lüneburg, the late Henry, Duke of Mecklenburg, to Henry IV of France, and Henry VIII of England.

According to Fowler, the English ambassador was conducted from the border to Stirling by a gentleman of the king's chamber on 28 August. The baptism was delayed until the 30 August because the English gifts or "propynes" had not arrived.

After the events were concluded and the ambassadors had left, the overworked administrator Alexander Hay of Easter Kennet died of exhaustion.

An engraving published in 1764 illustrating William Fowler's True Reportary purports to represent a painted allegory from the chapel or a decorative ensemble like a carved screen. It is not known if this illustration is a genuine representation of anything at the baptism, King James's return in 1617, or made for Charles I. The motifs include the building of Solomon's Temple, and the Last Trump. The motif of the Temple fits with contemporary comment about the project.

== Tournaments at the castle ==
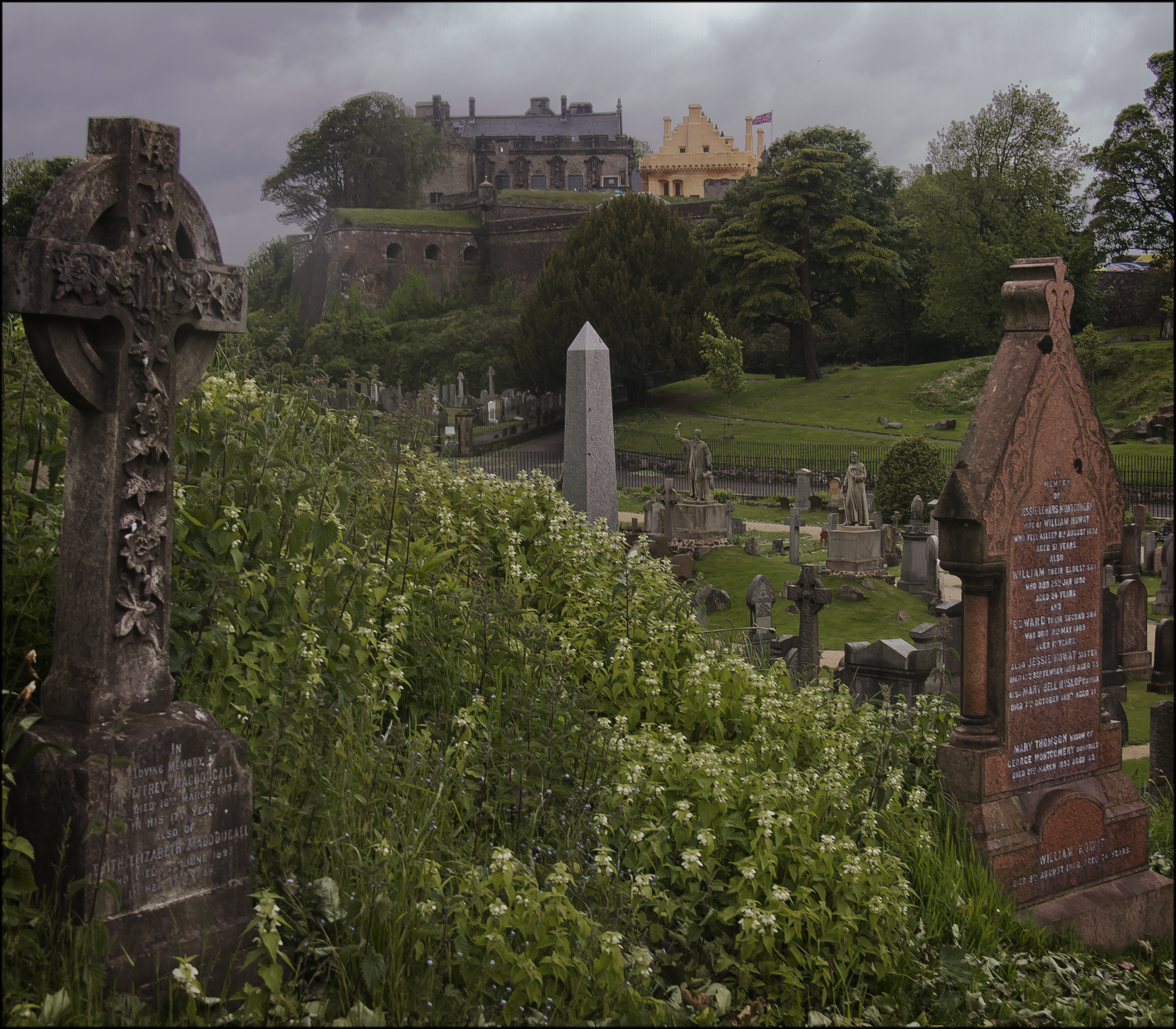
The tournament was held in the valley to the south of the castle, since 1857 a part of the Old Town Cemetery.

A tournament ground had been prepared at the "valley" west of the castle, with "carier and scaffold", a course and a grandstand. The first event was a competition called "running at the ring" in which horseriders collect hoops with lances or spears. There were three teams, one dressed as the Christian Knights of Malta, one in Turkish fashion, and three men dressed as Amazons. A fourth team, to be dressed as Africans called "Moors" did not show up. The event was held in the valley by the castle, and watched by the queen, Anne of Denmark, with her ladies-in-waiting, and the ambassadors. The audience was swelled by a large crowd of young men from Edinburgh armed with muskets.

The "Christian Knights" were James VI; the Earl of Mar; and Thomas Erskine of Gogar. The "Turks" were the Duke of Lennox; Lord Home; Sir Robert Kerr of Cessford. The "Amazons" were the Lord Lindores; the Laird of Buccleuch; and the Abbot of Holyroodhouse. These all bore devices or imprese pertaining to the themes of the festival. A draft for the emblems survives in Fowler's handwriting at the National Library of Scotland. He claims three were "my own" composition.

Anne of Denmark gave diamond rings to the victors led by the Duke of Lennox. The rings were probably those supplied to James VI by the goldsmith Thomas Foulis.

Some people were not pleased at the idea of the king and his companions dressed as the Catholic "Knights of the Holy Spirit". The intended interpretation was perhaps that the knights would be seen as Protestants overcoming "Turks" who represented the Catholic church. Naval battles between Christian and Turkish ships were presented in 1613 for the wedding of Princess Elizabeth and for Anne of Denmark at Bristol.

An event for the second day was cancelled because craftsmen could not be found to finish the costume and props, which would have included a tournament with knights riding on fantastic beasts, including a lion, elephant, unicorn, gryphon, hydra, crocodile, and a dragon, or so Fowler says.

=== Amazons and female disguise ===
The historian Clare McManus describes how these performances relate to the tournament of the Wild Knight and the Black Lady, serving to defuse the "threat of diversity" through theatrical representation. Amazons had featured in previous court festivities. A forerunner of this costumed event had been staged in December 1561 at the sands of Leith. The audience included Mary Queen of Scots, the English ambassador Thomas Randolph, the French ambassador Paul de Foix, and Monsieur de Moret, envoy from the Duke of Savoy. The competitors "running at the ring" included Mary's half brothers Lord John and Lord Robert, the Marquis of Elbeuf and others. There were two teams of six men, one team dressed as women, the other as exotic foreigners in strange masque garments. Lord Robert's team of "women" were the winners. Randolph wrote they were "dysguised and appareled th'one half lyke women, and th'other lyke strayngers, in straynge maskinge garmentes." A previous event in France, at Amboise had involved Mary's uncle Francis, the Grand Prior, dressed as a gypsy with a baby, and the Duke of Nemours as a townsman's wife with a bunch of keys.

A tournament at the marriage of the Earl of Warwick and Anne Russell at Westminster Palace on 11 November 1565 had also involved Amazons. The challengers at Westminster were accompanied by Amazons carrying their heraldry. These riders wore crimson gowns, masks with long hair attached, and swords.

== Textiles and costume ==
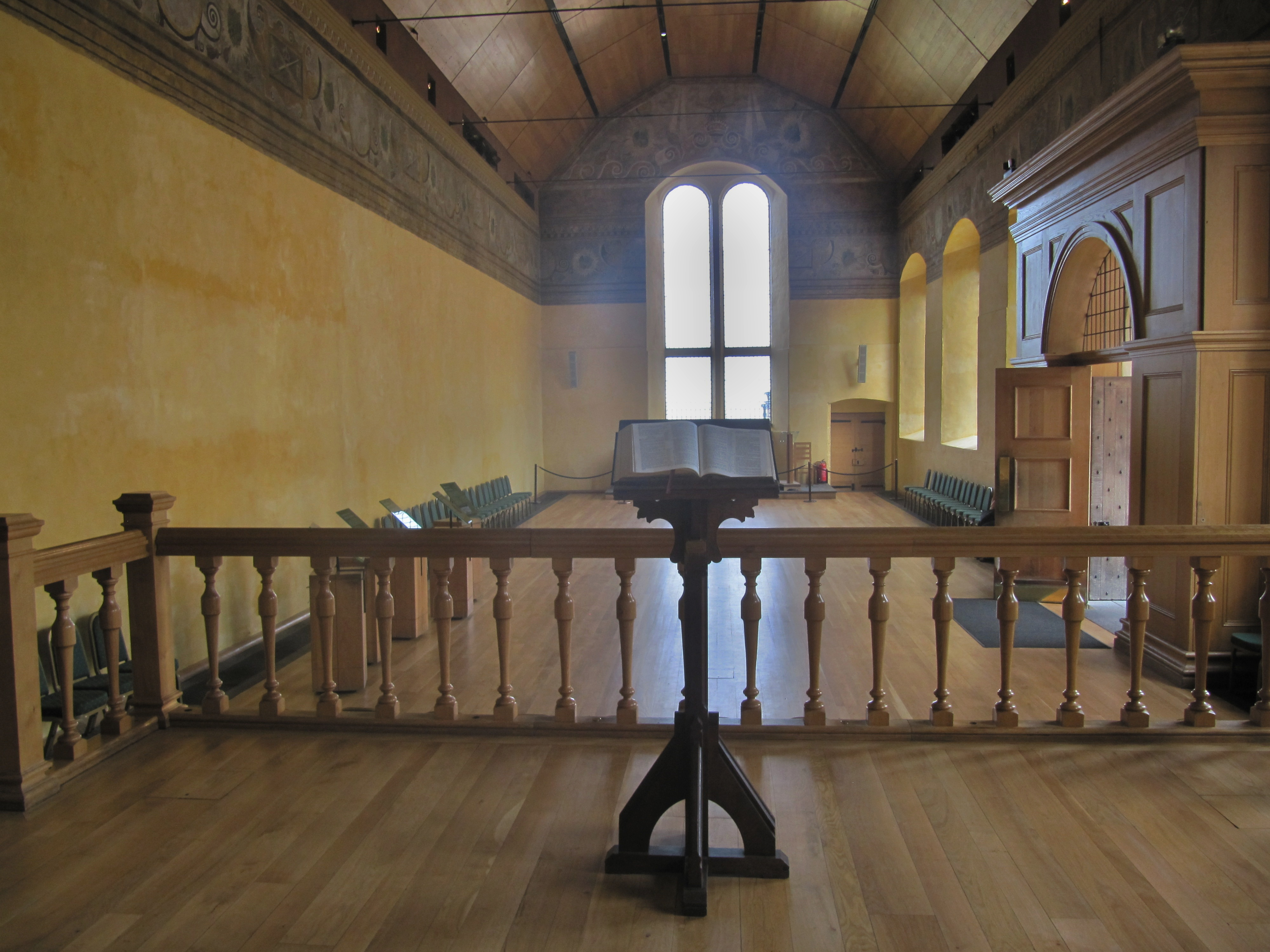
Seating for VIPs on the stage in the Chapel Royal was colour coded in velvet.

An ordinance for the arrangement of furnishing and seats in the chapel survives, the "Form and Ordering of the Chapel for the Baptism". Records of payments for furnishing textiles and some of the costume for the event are included in the manuscript account of Robert Jousie held by the National Records of Scotland.

The king's seat and nine seats for ambassadors on the stage at the upper end of the Chapel Royal were provided with cushions and desk cloths made in ten different colours of velvet by the court embroiderer William Betoun. James VI sat on a cushion of "incarnadin vellvot perlit with sillver" - pink velvet edged with silver embroidery. The place for the ambassador from Brunswick was green. A vacant seat in the chapel next to the king was reserved for the French ambassador. The Dutch ambassadors Brederode and Valcke found their seat was decorated with the wrong coats of arms, and they asked for the arms of Holland and Zeeland to be taken down and replaced with the shields of the six United Provinces. Fowler's published account in the True Reportarie understandably does not include this mix-up.

James VI had ordered outfits to wear for the ceremonies from his tailor Alexander Miller, including a suit of violet and rose peach satin with cloth of gold, with a violet velvet cloak. The fabrics bought for the king's clothes included cloth of "silver argentyne", cloth of gold, and "fyn clayth of sillver" costing £30 per ell measure, and almost all of his six outfits each cost over £1000 Scots. New clothes were made for members of the royal household for the event, including William Schaw, Patrick Murray, and the valets John Gibb, William Stewart, and William Murray (a son of James Murray the barber of James V).

== The baptism ==
The third day, 30 August, was the baptism proper in the Chapel Royal. Anne of Denmark does not figure in Fowler's account of the ceremony and it seems Annabell Murray, Countess of Mar took her place.

A note of the positions of the guests in the chapel by the antiquarian James Balfour conforms to Fowler's narrative and the newsletter account printed in Foedera. There was a bar dividing the space and the King's chair was placed on a stage or raised dais at the upper or north-east end of the chapel. The ambassadors sat beside King James on the stage, on the left hand the ambassadors of Denmark, Mecklenburg and Luneberg, and on the right the two English diplomats and the ambassadors of Brunswick and Holland. Standing on the stage near the King's seat were George Home as master of the wardrobe, the captain of the guard, Peter Young as almoner, and Thomas Erskine.

The True Reportarie explains that the new pulpit, decked with cloth of gold was within the partition or bar on the stage side. On the other side of the bar there were benches upholstered with green cloth for the ambassadors' entourages.

The English ambassador, the Earl of Sussex, accompanied by the nurses carried the prince into the chapel in procession under a canopy or "pale" newly made of red "crammosye" velvet. The canopy was held up by the gentlemen bearers Laird of Buccleuch, the Constable of Dundee, Robert Ker of Cessford, and the Laird of Traquair. The ambassadors, the Countess of Mar, Eleanor Bowes, and other women walked beside the canopy the short distance from the outer chamber in the place across the courtyard to the chapel.

The route across the courtyard, from the "door of the transe of the new work" - the door of the palace gallery or "transe", to the chapel door was lined by young men from Edinburgh in armour with their muskets.

As part of the Scottish royal baptism ceremony, the "Prince's Honours" were displayed. Lord Sempill carried a laver to the chapel, Lord Seton a basin, Lord Levingston a towel, and the Earl of Home carried a low crown suitable for a duke, set with diamonds, sapphires, emeralds and rubies. The Master of Ceremonies (possibly William Schaw) placed these items on a table near the pulpit.

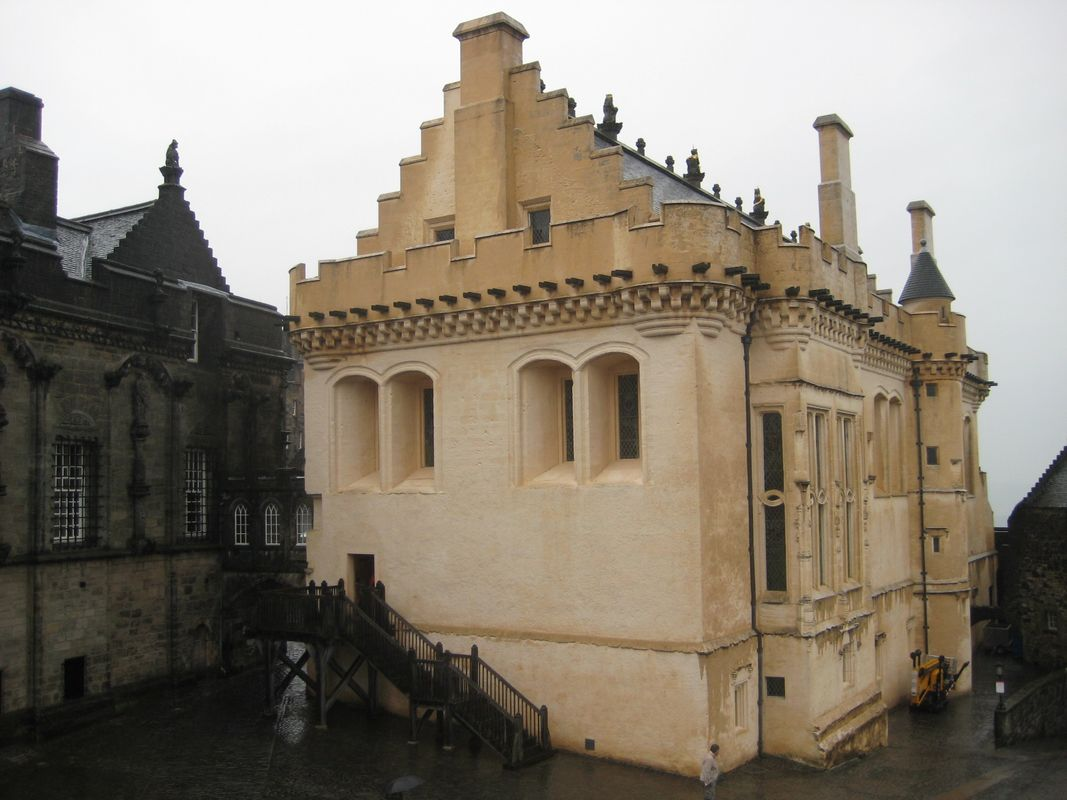
The name of the prince, "Henry Frederick", was announced from a window of the Great Hall.

In the chapel the Earl of Sussex passed the child to the Countess of Mar, and the nursery staff. Patrick Galloway gave a sermon in Scots based on the Book of Judges, then David Cunningham, Bishop of Aberdeen preached in Latin, both on the text Genesis 21. Cunningham performed the actual baptism ceremony, and King James and the ambassadors gathered around him. Musicians sang Psalm 21, which John Calvin had related to the succession of rulers on Earth.

After the baptism, King James descended from his seat on the stage with the ambassadors. The pale was moved from the pulpit (a wooden structure which survives today) to where the Countess of Mar stood with the Prince. She passed the prince to Lennox, who passed him to the Earl of Sussex. The Prince's name was proclaimed from the window of the great hall to the crowd in the outer close and "trumpets blew with great noise". The prince was carried under the canopy back to the palace, and saluted by all the cannons in the castle. In the chapel, some English attendants had washed the Earl of Sussex's hands, which was seen as a breach of etiquette.

The Bishop of Aberdeen spoke again, describing the genealogy of the prince, his English descent, and also the recent history of the diplomatic relations of Scotland and alliances with the ambassadors present, and then the Chapel service concluded. The role of a bishop at this baptism was controversial and the Presbytery of Edinburgh had asked kirk ministers to prevent or boycott David Cunningham's participation. Cunningham's second speech was problematic for its overt reference to the English succession, reminding the audience of a controversial poem by Andrew Melville, Principis Scoti Brittanorum Natalia.

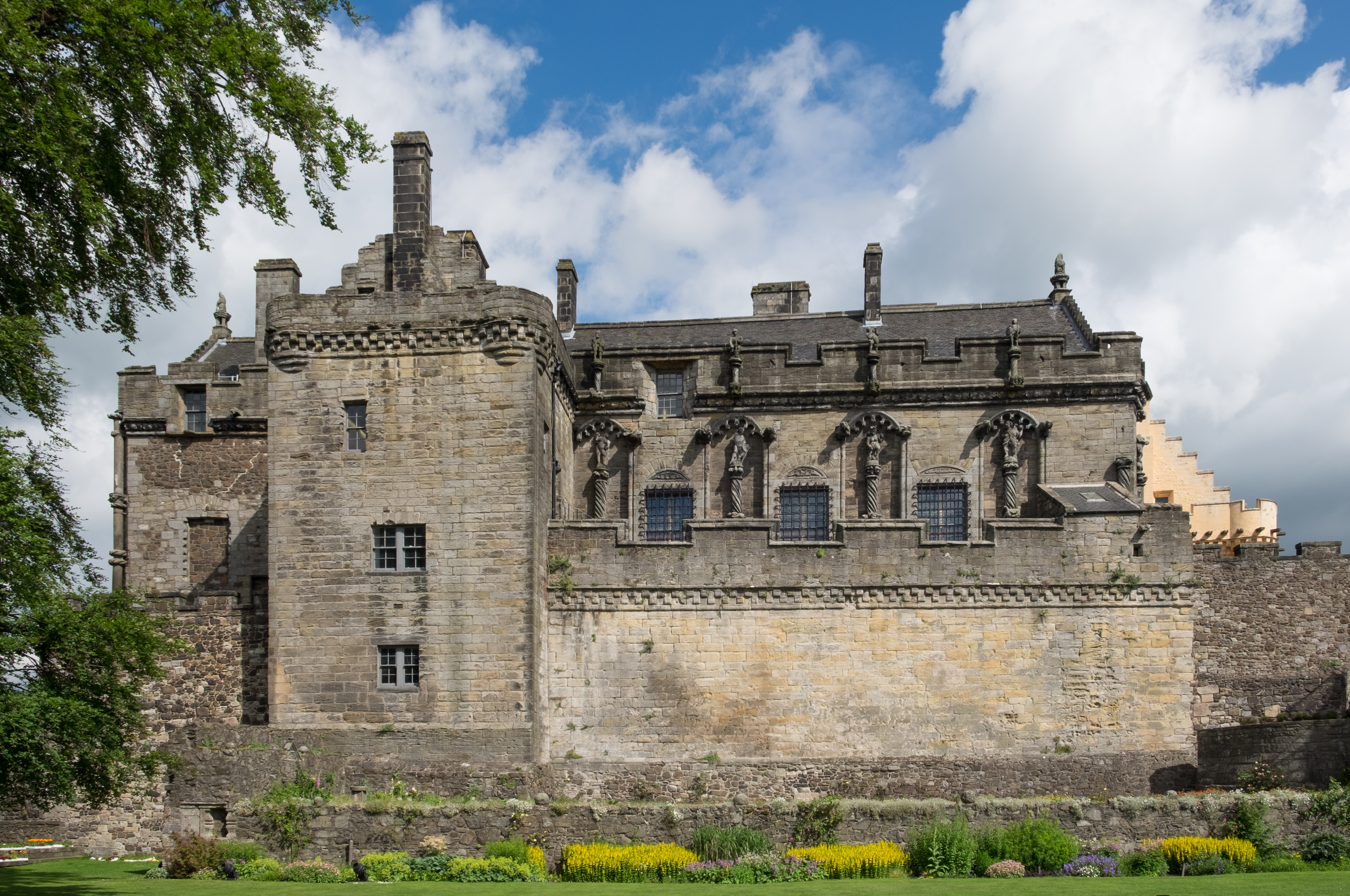
The names of newly made knights were proclaimed from the terrace of Stirling Palace and gold coins were thrown into the crowd below.

The guests in the chapel went back across the upper courtyard to the queen's inner hall in the Palace. There Prince Henry was knighted with a spur held by the Earl of Mar and crowned as a duke by his father. He was given the titles Great Steward of Scotland, Duke of Rothesay, Earl of Carrick, Lord of the Isles, and Baron of Renfrew.

After this several Scottish men were made knights in the queen's outer hall. The names of the newly made knights were proclaimed from the terrace at the forefront of the palace with sound of trumpets, and gold and other coins were cast amongst the people in the garden below as largesse. Next, Anne of Denmark received the gifts that the ambassadors had brought. The ambassadors were then escorted back to their lodgings until supper time.

== Feast and masque ==
=== Maidens, a lion, and an African actor ===
At the supper or feast that evening at 8 o'clock, the first course was served by the new-made knights. For the second course, a table laden with desserts of pâtisserie, fruit, and sugar confectionaries was drawn up the length of the Great Hall with six maidens, presumably ladies-in-waiting to Anne of Denmark, either sitting on the table or standing beside it, in masque costumes. Three were clothed in "argentine" (silver) satin, and three in crimson satin, all these six garments were enriched with "togue" (tock) and tinsel, of pure gold and silver, with a crowne or garland on their heads, very richly decked with feathers, pearls, "and jewels upon their loose haire, in Antica forma". They represented Ceres, Fecundity, Faith, Concord, Liberality, and Perseverance (Assurance). The figure of Ceres held the traditional attributes of a sickle and a sheaf of corn. The motto Fundent uberes omnia Campia—the plentiful fields will provide—was written on her thigh. She may have represented an idealised Anne of Denmark.

William Fowler called this scene a "silent comedy" and explained that it had been intended a real lion should haul the tableau, but on consideration this might be too frightening for the guests, or the lion might be startled and the bright lights "commove his tameness" with unfortunate results. Instead an African man, who Fowler called "the Moore", gave the appearance of dragging the scene along with golden chains or cart traces. It "appeared to be drawn in only by the strength of a Moore". In reality it was moved by "secret convoy", hidden ropes and mechanism that remained "unperceived".

Fowler's story of a hasty substitution of the lion with "the Moore" can be read as demonstrating an equivalence between the exotic foreigner and animal, their strength perhaps as tokens of royal power. Originally, plans for the banquet had included the appearance of both the lion and "the Moore". The first service of the meal would be brought by the newly made knights and Masters of the Household, the second on "the chariot of triumph drawn by a Moor accompanied with six personages", and the third "upon the chariot of triumph drawn by a lion", the fourth by the ship. The lion was transported from Holyrood to Stirling before the change of plan.

The African actor may have performed in 1590 at Anne of Denmark's Entry into Edinburgh, as the leader of the fortunate people who dwelt by "SYNERDAS" who processed down the Canongate. The queen also had an African servant in her household listed as "the Moir" in 1590, who was bought clothes with her pages, but there is no further record of this man.

=== Shakespeare and a lion amongst ladies ===
The lion was probably the animal sent to James in July 1593 by Christian IV of Denmark, which had been given to him by the King of Poland, and was said to be tame enough to be led about by two boys. Christian IV also sent a keeper, William Freliche who remained in Scotland until August 1596. The significance of the lion or Moor in the masque pulling the tableau of ladies is perhaps unclear in the evidence. The black actor and the goddess courtiers were "silent spectacles of strangeness", and the actor and lion seem "interchangeable symbols of exotic physical strength" as markers of sovereign power.

The substitution of the African actor for the lion at Stirling was suggested by Edmond Malone and others as a source of an allusion in Shakespeare's play A Midsummer Night's Dream, which was written soon afterwards. As the characters discuss their play-within-a-play of Pyramus and Thisbe, Snout wonders "Will not the ladies be afeard of the lion?", and Bottom says, "God shield us! a lion among ladies, is a most dreadful thing". The fearsome character of lions is also discussed in Arthur Brooke's much earlier poem, The Tragical History of Romeus and Juliet, a source used by Shakespeare. This Stirling-Shakespeare connection and untold Black history at the Scottish court is explored in a 2022 film and moving image performance OMOS.

=== A ship laden with sugar fish ===
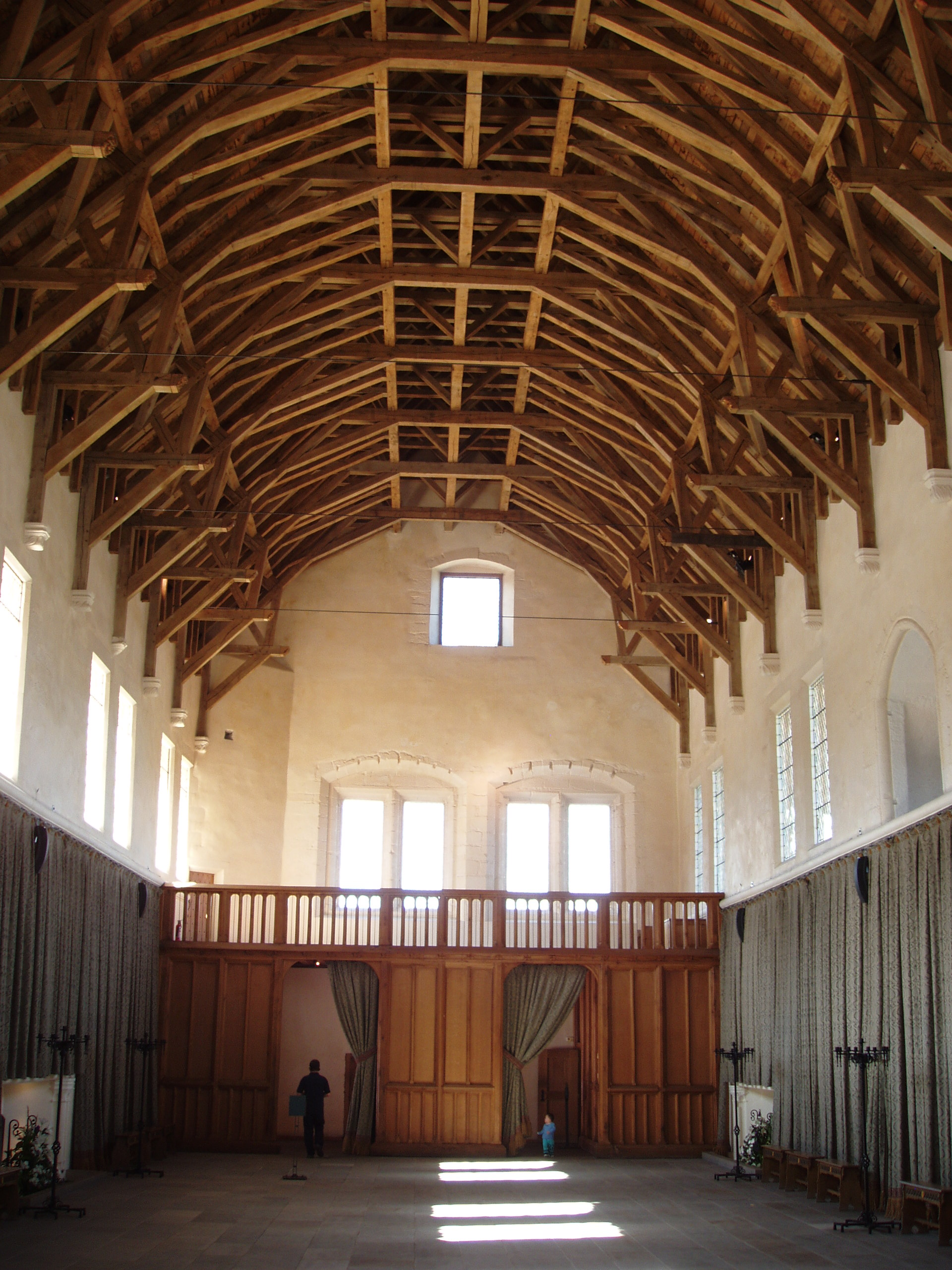
Neptune's ship was presented in a masque in the Great Hall of Stirling Castle.

After this tableau was removed, a large model ship was brought into the Great Hall, or uncovered there. This was to evoke to the King's journey to Norway and Denmark in 1589 to meet Anne of Denmark, in the manner of Jason and the Argonauts, as if Neptune, the pilot of the ship, had made their marriage, despite the "conspiracies of witches". The fore-sail was painted with a compass and the North Star, the main sail with the arms of Scotland and Denmark. Thetis and Triton were also on board, with six sailors wearing shot-silk, and fourteen musicians dressed in Stewart red and yellow. The ship was accompanied by three women dressed as mermaids or sirens, as Parthenope, Ligeia, and Leucosia, who sang and mimed in time to the music. There were thirty six working brass cannons.

The ship was laden with all kinds of fish made from sugar, including herring, whiting, flounders, oysters, whelks, lobsters, crabs, and clams "all vividly represented in their own shape. The desserts were served in Venetian glasses tinted with azure, which were distributed while Arion seated on a dolphin played his harp. Some Latin verses in praise of Anne were sung, followed by Psalm 128 in canon with musical accompaniment. Triton blew his trumpet and Neptune whistled, and then the ship sailed away, firing the rest of its guns. Fowler's book gives the dimensions:

"Presently after the returning of the Chariot, entered a most sumpteous, artificiall, and well proportioned ship, the length of her keele, was 18. foot, and her bredth 8. foote: from her bottome to her highest flagge, was 40. foot: the Sea shee stoode vpon, was 24. foot long, with bredth convenient: her motion was so artificially devised within her self, that none could perceive what brought her in."

William Fowler explained the theme of the ship, attributing it King James, and showing that it related to the sea journeys of James VI and Anne of Denmark in 1589, "The Kings Majestie, having undertaken in such a desperate time, to sayle to Norway, and like a newe Jason, to bring his Queene our gracious Lady to this Kingdome, being detained and stopped by the conspiracies of Witches, and such devillish Dragons, thought it very meet, to followe forth this his owne invention".

The ship was kept for many years in the Chapel Royal. The English writer John Ray saw it in 1662. In 1610 the masque Tethys' Festival at the investiture of Prince Henry as Prince of Wales also had a maritime theme, Anne of Denmark played a sea goddess Tethys in Milford Haven harbour, while her ladies-in-waiting personified rivers. The banquet at the King James's baptism in December 1566 at Stirling Castle had also involved food on moving stages, with dancing choreographed by Bastian Pagez.

=== Sugar banquet in the palace ===
James and Anne and the ambassadors went into a room in the Palace, hung with recently repaired tapestry, where there was another sugar banquet. Sugar confections and sculptures were made for the court by Jacques de Bousie, a Flemish specialist. Bousie and Jerome Bowie were paid £220 Scots for glasses to serve the desserts. Meanwhile, the Great Hall was cleared for revels, which Fowler did not describe further. The event ended at 3 o'clock in the morning. Over the next few days James gave gifts to the ambassadors.

== Ambassadors and diplomatic gift-giving ==
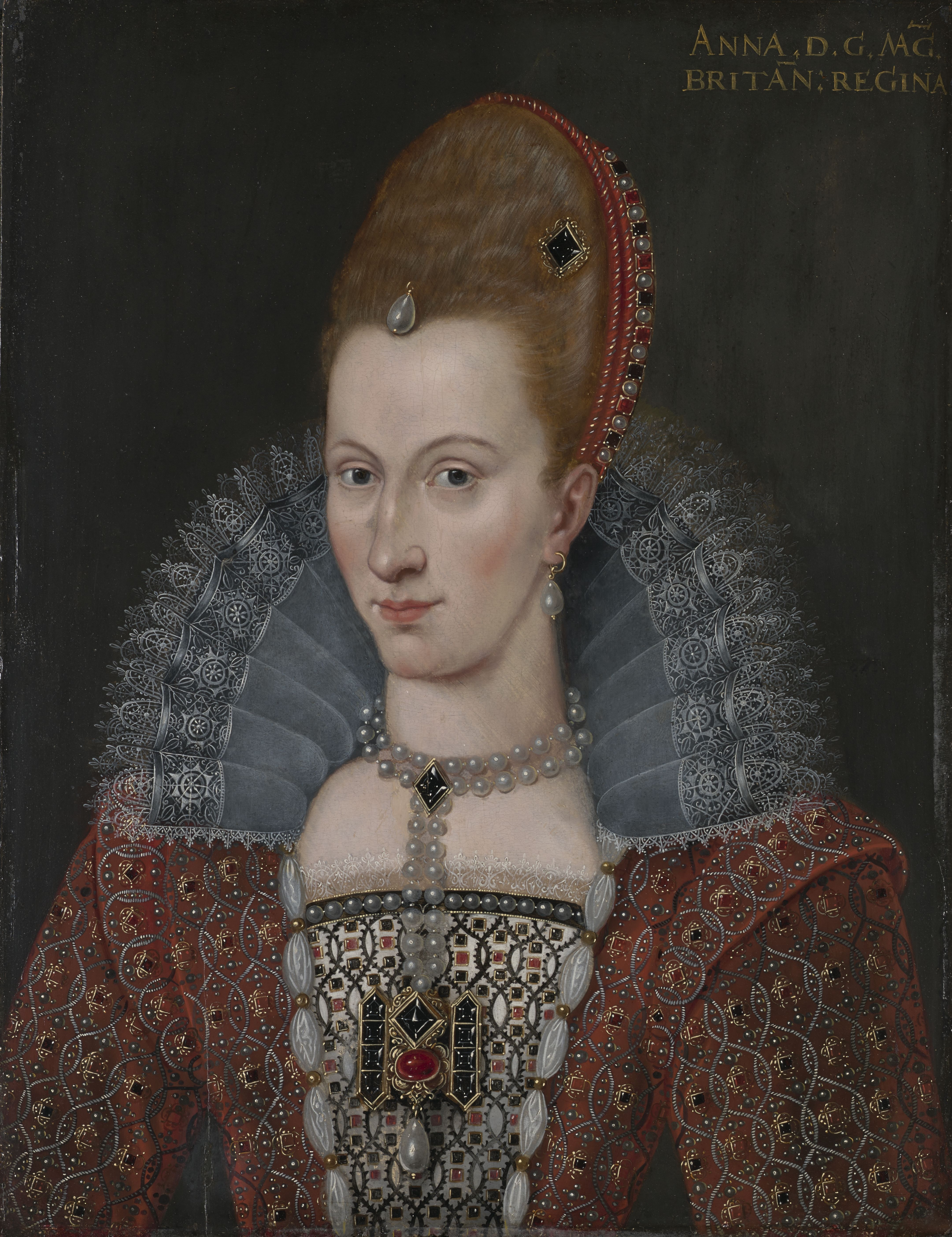
Anne of Denmark accepted gifts from the ambassadors in a ceremony held in her audience chamber in the palace.

Robert Radclyffe, 5th Earl of Sussex was the ambassador from England. His companions in Scotland were Lord Wharton, Sir Henry Bromley of Holt, Hugh Portman, Henry Guildford, Oliver Cromwell, Thomas Monson, Henry Clare, Edward Greville, Nicholas Sanderson, Edward Gorges, and William Jeffson, with Richard Coningsby and Mr. Rolles. Robert Bowes, the English ambassador in ordinary in Scotland and his wife Eleanor Musgrove also attended. The baptism was delayed until this party arrived at Stirling Castle. They came through Newcastle upon Tyne where Sussex left his coach, and they were given presents of sugar-loaves, claret, and sack.

Sussex had audiences with James VI of Scotland and Anne of Denmark on 29 August. During the baptism ceremony Sussex carried the child from his bedchamber for the day in the queen's inner hall in the Palace to the Chapel Royal, closely supervised by the Countess of Mar. The only Englishmen in the chapel during the ceremony were Sussex, Henry Bromley, and Lord Wharton. After discussions with James about Catholics and rebels in Scotland, Sussex left Scotland on 12 September and was injured by a horse near Northallerton on 14 September.

Sir James Melville of Halhill, a gentleman in the queen's household, described the audience with Anne of Denmark for the ambassadors in the palace of Stirling Castle, when she received their gifts. Melville stood behind the queen, beside a table placed especially in the middle of the chamber for the ceremony. According to the "Form and Ordering" this ceremony took place after the making of knights, before the feast and masque. Melville wrote that Anne of Denmark spoke to the English, the Danish, and the German ambassadors from Mecklenburg and Brunswick in their own languages, but asked him to interpret her speech into French for the Dutch ambassadors, even though her own French was "seemly". The ambassadors who gave gifts of jewelry handed them to the queen, then she passed them to Melville, who returned them to their decorative cases and laid them on the table. There was an element of competition in this gift-giving, and on Elizabeth's part an effort to assert her relationship to the king of Scotland and the matter of the English succession. The Earl of Sussex wrote that the "Scots, Danes, Germans and Dutchmen" admired the gifts as "the most stately presents that ever they saw".

=== Gifts for a prince ===
The Earl of Sussex brought gifts of plate from Elizabeth including some older pieces, noted by Melville as "cunningly wrought" and as "ancient" with "stones of small value" in a Scottish inventory. A silver cup was decorated with hart heads and branches of coral on its cover. A gold cup with marguerite pearls and rubies about the foot and sapphires may have belonged to Margaret of Anjou (1430–1482) or Margaret Tudor (1489–1541). A cup decorated with snakes, newts, frogs coloured in enamels with a stag hunt on the cover had been admired by Lupold von Wedel in 1584 in the Tower of London. It was probably German, and had been bought for Elizabeth from Richard Martin.

The Danish ambassadors were Steen Bille (1565–1629) and Christian Barnekow (1556–1612). It had been rumoured that Manderup Parsberg, one of the four Regents of Denmark would attend. On 10 October 1589 Bille had brought a letter from Anne of Denmark to James VI explaining that she had given up trying to sail Scotland after five failed attempts. Now Bille and Barnekow brought gold chains each worth 500 French crowns for the queen and prince. A chain with pearls and diamonds had a pendant with "CHRISTIANUS" spelled out in diamonds.

There was an ambassador, Adam Crusius or Crause of Borchfelda (Bortfeld), from the Duke of Brunswick. Crusius presented a chain of gold pea-pods enameled with green, with a locket containing a miniature portrait of the Duke of Brunswick and the story of the Diana and Actaeon on the lid, and a chain made of gold whelk shells for Anne of Denmark.

Joachim von Bassewitz was sent by Anne's grandfather, the Duke of Mecklenburg. Bassewitz brought a chain or necklace for the queen made up of rubies, chrysolites, and hyacinths, which he told the English diplomats represented the roses of York and Lancaster. It was suitable for Anne of Denmark to wear on the front of gown made in the French fashion, now current. For Prince Henry he brought a portrait miniature of the Duke of Mecklenburg encircled with diamonds, with four larger diamonds at the quarters, in a locket shaped like a book which opened to reveal scenes of the Annunciation and Nativity. Another chain of jewels and enamelled beasts had a pendant of a man riding a winged horse. Anne's court jeweler, Jacob Kroger, had been executed for theft in June. Some of the jewels had been obtained by Francis Stewart, 5th Earl of Bothwell who returned them to try to win royal favour. Bassewitz attempted to speak with Robert Bowes on Bothwell's behalf.

Walraven III van Brederode (1547–1614) and Jacob Valke, treasurer of Zeeland were the ambassadors from the Dutch Republic or United Provinces. A Fugger newsletter reported, perhaps incorrectly, that Brederode would be accompanied Philips of Marnix, Lord of Saint-Aldegonde. The Dutch ambassadors presented two large gold cups and a letter in a gold box giving Prince Henry a yearly pension of 5,000 "Gelderlings" or "Gudlenes". James Melville of Halhill was impressed by the weight of the cups, describing the "great cups of massive gold, two in special, which were enough for me to lift and set down again on the said table". According to a Fugger newsletter each cup was the equivalent of 6,000 Rhinegulden. In September, the cups were given to the goldsmith Thomas Foulis, in lieu of a debt, to be minted into £5 coins.

James VI gave the ambassadors gifts in the days after the baptism. Brederode and Valke received gold chains worth 500 crowns each, Christian Bernekow and Steen Bille had gold chains worth 400 crowns, chains for Adam Crusius and Joachim Bassewitz cost 300 crowns. The Earl of Sussex was given a set of silver-gilt plates, the metal worth £4,800 Scots and making them cost £600. They held a banquet for the king and queen on their ship anchored on the Forth.

The ambassadors' departure in three great ships with a salvo of 60 cannon shots was noted by William Fowler. The writer, Giacomo Castelvetro, who had been teaching Italian at the Scottish court, left with Christian Barnekow. The representatives of the "States of Flanders", Brederode and Valke, traveled from the Baptism to Berwick upon Tweed where they were entertained by John Carey on 18 September, and on to Newcastle upon Tyne where they were welcomed with lavish civic festivities. They were treated to a banquet including baked rabbit, fish, and swan, a barrel of London beer, and sugar confectionaries, to the accompaniment of music by the town's waits.

=== Drama, diplomacy, rivalry, and etiquette ===
Five years earlier, Queen Elizabeth had planned a masque for her ambassador to present at the arrival of Anne of Denmark in Scotland in September 1589. Anne however was forced to stay in Norway by accidents and bad weather, the circumstances which gave rise to Fowler mentioning thanksgiving for deliverance from witchcraft. The ambassador's masque would have comprised: six dancers wearing swords or falchions with helmets dressed with feather plumes, presumably representing classical warriors; six masked torchbearers with hats with feathers, their costumes parti-coloured in the Stewart colours red and yellow; four speaking parts wearing wigs and flower chaplets. Only the account for making the costumes is known, and the subject of the masque was not recorded. At the same time, James VI had sent Roger Aston to Lord Scrope at Carlisle for actors from the Queen's Players who were at Knowsley Hall to perform in Edinburgh. These players may have performed for the Earl of Bothwell after James VI had sailed for Norway.

Some English players or comedians were paid in February 1594, and in March 1595 a recent visit to Scotland by the actor Lawrence Fletcher was mentioned by George Nicholson. There is no direct evidence to connect Fletcher and these English players with the events at Stirling in August 1594. James VI was evidently fond of Fletcher, an actor who might have been "hanged for his cause."

It was usual for the king to appoint companions for ambassadors in Scotland to entertain and assist them, and James VI wrote to Sir John Gordon of Pitlurg in June 1594 offering him this role. James Melville of Halhill described some tensions between the ambassadors in the summer of 1594. He said two of the Scottish envoys sent with invitations were unsuitable. Sir William Keith of Delny could not speak French, Latin, or Flemish, and the laird of Easter Wemyss was chosen only because he happened to be travelling to London and Paris on his own business. Melville states that Peter Young went to Denmark, Brunswick, and Mecklenburg, and was rewarded with gifts of three gold chains, but the dukes felt they would have been better honoured by a separate ambassador to each of them. Easter Wemyss received no rewards, because he was a messenger and did not have the status of an ambassador. Melville claimed that Elizabeth was more enthusiastic to be represented at the event when she learned that Henry IV of France was not sending an ambassador, despite the invitation delivered by the laird of Wemyss.

The Danish ambassadors and the ambassadors from the two German dukes had arrived in Leith on 11 and 12 July. Melville was appointed to greet them, but he could not persuade them to ride up to Holyrood Palace together in the same convoy and instead had to organise two processions. As the day of the masque and baptism was postponed, Melville had to entertain the ambassadors in Edinburgh, with his brothers Andrew Melville of Garvock and William Melville, Commendator of Tungland. Robert Bowes said the ambassadors were entertained by various lairds of Lothian in turn, at the king's request. John Colville wrote that the day after the ambassadors arrived Anne of Denmark took the ferry to Fife and went to Falkland Palace to avoid them because she felt her accommodation at Holyroodhouse was not up to scratch. When she had an audience with them they discussed a plan for her younger sister Augusta of Denmark to marry Maurice, Prince of Orange, but nothing came of it. Henry IV of France sent a polite letter of thanks for the invitation on 1 October 1594 when the laird of Easter Wemyss returned from Paris.

Balthasar Fuchs von Bimbach came to Scotland with the Danish ambassadors. As was customary, he kept an Album Amicorum, a kind of autograph book, recording the people he met, including Peter Young, Andrew Sinclair of Ravenscraig, and Robert Seton, 6th Lord Seton, who was the Grand Master of the Household at the baptism.

== Paying the bills ==
In the 17th century, Edward Peyton wrote that Patrick Stewart, 2nd Earl of Orkney, had raised money for the baptism by mortgaging his lands. There is no evidence to back this up. Patrick Leslie, Commendator of Lindores, who was involved in organising the entertainments, was married to the Earl of Orkney's sister Jean, a connection which may have suggested this assertion.

James VI set a tax of £100,000 (Scots) for the expenses. Textiles and costumes for the event were bought using Anne's dowry of £100,000 (Scots) which had been in the safekeeping of various towns. Costumes for the women of Queen Anne's household were bought using £4000 held at St Andrews and Anstruther, while £3000 from Perth paid for upholstery and repairs to tapestry. The textile merchant and financier Robert Jousie received £1000 from Aberdeen. According to the author of the Historie and Life of King James the Sext the dowry money had been lodged with the towns to give the queen an annual income, and James was urged to spend it by corrupt advisors to offset his expenditure on "unnecessary" armed troops.

Textiles worth £1,500 Sterling were provided by the English mercer Baptist Hicks, who may have supplied textiles to the royal wardrobe throughout the decade. The debt was still unpaid in 1606. James VI also wrote letters to his lairds, asking them to send "quick stuff", live animals especially deer and wild fowl, such as they "may have in readiness and spare" as gifts.

Some items, like the transport of the unused lion from Holyroodhouse to Stirling, and clothes for James's former nurse Helen Littil and her daughters Grissel and Sarah Gray, were paid for through the usual Royal Treasurer's account. Other items, like the gifts given to ambassadors and a piece of alabaster used in the chapel, came from subsidy money sent by Queen Elizabeth and managed by the jeweller and financier Thomas Foulis. In September 1594 James VI gave to Foulis the gold cups presented by the Dutch ambassadors to melt down and coin to cover some of his debt.

Anne of Denmark received £18,796 Scots from Thomas Foulis from the English subsidy money between July 1591 and 13 September 1594, which may have been available to meet the costs of her household and some expenses of the baptism. Queen Elizabeth noted that £2,000 sterling of the subsidy money in the summer of 1594 was spent in London. After the baptism, she insisted that all of the next installment was sent to Scotland, where she hoped James would use the money in his campaign against the Catholic earls.

No detailed records of making the masque costumes described by Fowler, or building the Chapel Royal survive. Andrew Melville of Garvock, a Master of Household, was paid £6,666 13s 4d Scots for the expenses of the Danish ambassadors during the visit. The sum was raised from a composition fee of 10,000 merks charged Colonel William Stewart for a grant of the lands of Houston in West Lothian.

== Stirling Castle today ==
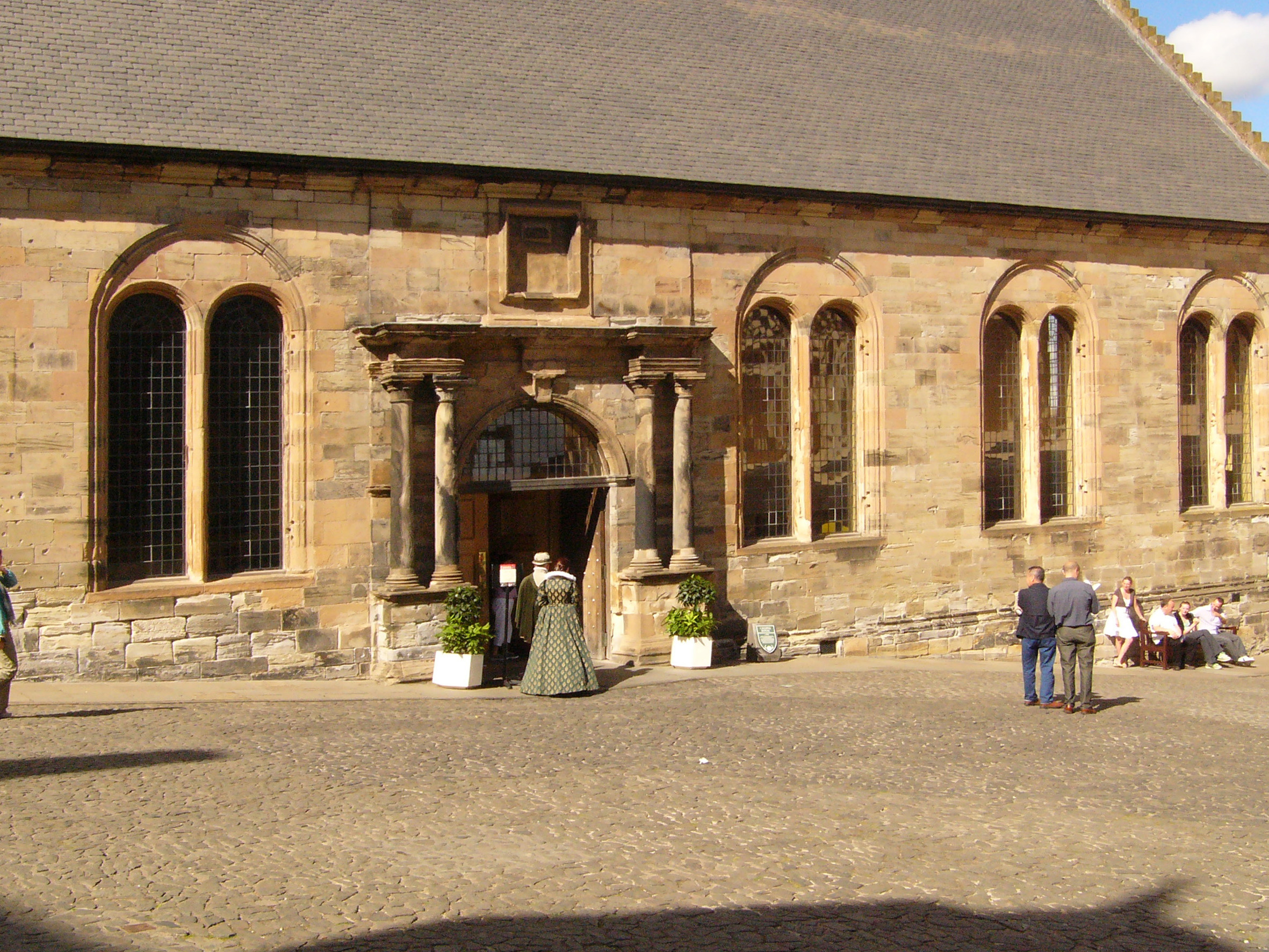
The Chapel Royal was built for the baptism in Italianate style with proportions evoking the Temple of Solomon to the designs of William Schaw.

The buildings that formed the backdrop for the events of the baptism are still intact with few external changes since 1594. The interiors of the Great Hall, Chapel Royal, and Palace have been returned to their original layout and proportions, and subdivisions made during the later use of the castle as army barracks removed. The rooms in the palace were restored in 2010. Painted decoration surviving in the Chapel Royal by Valentine Jenkin mostly dates from 1629 and shadow traces of paintwork from 1594 can be seen on the exterior around the windows. The Prince's Tower, adjacent to the Palace, was also refurbished with new floors at this time. No furnishings from 1594 are known to survive, except a plain oak pulpit possibly used by Patrick Galloway and David Cunningham, which is stored by Historic Environment Scotland.

The architectural spaces of August 1594 can still be explored and experienced by visitors today. The Chapel Royal was purpose-built in 1594 under the direction of William Schaw, who was Master of Work to the king and the queen, and an administrator of the queen's landed income. Some of the timber was selected on the Shore of Leith by the king's carpenter James Murray, elder. The building has a central triumphal arch as an entrance, flanked by Italianate windows, and can be described as the first Renaissance style church in Britain. The north façade is featureless. An older chapel on the site was judged inadequate for its bad proportions by a previous Master of Work Robert Drummond of Carnock in May 1583. Ian Campbell and Aonghus MacKechnie argue that the proportions of the new building and a partition or barrier in the original interior mentioned by William Fowler matched ratios in the Bible for the measurements of the Temple of Solomon. James VI had been compared to Solomon by his courtiers and poets, and while the chapel was being built John Colville described it in a letter as "the great Temple of Solomon". However, this connection was not developed in William Fowler's description of the baptism pageant. Campbell and MacKechnie propose that the physical embodiment of the Temple in the architecture, rather than the allusion to kingship made by Colville, was a secret kept by the masons.

== The legacy for historians ==
The events of the baptism were intended to convey a cluster of meanings; the genealogy of Prince Henry, the legitimacy of the Scottish succession to the crown of England, the wealth of Scotland, its faith, the difficulties that James VI and Anne of Denmark faced crossing the sea as an epic battle against witchcraft, and Scotland's presence on the international stage. Modern historians continue to debate these themes, and also with a focus on the role of Anne, or Anna of Denmark as an agent in these events, or debate the role of the African actor, and the costumed performances.

== Knights made at the baptism ==
After the baptism ceremony in the Chapel Royal several Scottish men were made knights in the queen's outer hall of the Palace. The names of the newly made knights were proclaimed from the terrace at the forefront of the palace with sound of trumpets, and gold and other coins were cast amongst the people in the garden below. The knights included:

- Andrew Balfour of Strathure
- John Boswell of Balmuto
- John Boswell of Glasemont
- Robert Bruce of Clackmannan
- Walter Dundas of Over Newliston
- George Elphinstone of Blythswood
- James Forester of Torwood-head.
- Alexander Fraser of Fraserburgh
- John Lindsay of Dunrod
- George Livingston of Ogilface
- William Livingston of Darnchester
- David Meldrum of Newhall
- William Menteith of Kerse
- John Murray of Ethilstoun
- James Schaw of Sauchie
- William Stewart of Houston
- Sir John Wemyss of Wemyss
- Sir William Mays
