= Andrew Sinclair (privy counsellor) =

Scottish nobleman and Danish privy counsellor

Herr Anders Sincklar af Ravenscraig

Rigsråd
- In office 1617–1625

Envoy to England
- In office 1604–1621

Lensmand
- In office 1600–1625

Personal details
- Born: Andrew Sinclair; 1 January 1555 Dysart, Fife, Scotland
- Died: 17 January 1625 (aged 70)
- Spouse: Kirsten Kaas (m. 1600)
- Children: Jakob Sinclair; Johanne Andersdatter Sinclair; Erik Sinclair; Christian Sinclair (1607–1645)

Military service
- Branch/service: Danish Army
- Years of service: 1611–1625
- Rank: Colonel
- Unit: Scanian Regiment
- Battles/wars: Kalmar War
- Awards: Knight of the Armoured Arm

Sir Andrew Sinclair of Ravenscraig, in Denmark known as Anders Sincklar (Sinklar, Sinclar), til Ravenscraig og Sincklarsholm, born 1555, died 1625, was a Scotsman of noble birth, who became a Danish privy counsellor, envoy to England, colonel, and holder of extensive fiefs.

== Early life ==
Sinclair was the third son of Henry Sinclair, 6th Lord Sinclair, and Janet Lindsay, in his fathers first marriage. For a period he was brought up at the court of Henry I, Duke of Guise.

In September 1589 James VI of Scotland was waiting for the arrival of his bride Anne of Denmark. On the 10 October 1589 the Danish envoy Steen Bille and Andrew Sinclair arrived in Leith with her letters. She had decided to stay over-winter in Norway. In October 1589 Sinclair sailed back to Norway with James VI to meet Anne of Denmark. He went ahead from Flekkerøy with Steen Bille to Anne at Oslo with news of their arrival. A Danish source mentions he was a tall young man.

Sinclair stayed with the king in Denmark and handed out rewards to shipbuilders in Copenhagen. Sinclar stayed at the Danish royal court and became hofjunker to Christian IV of Denmark in 1591, and in 1597 kammerjunker to the queen, Anne Catherine of Brandenburg.

Sinclair attended the baptism of Prince Henry at Stirling Castle in 1594 and James VI gave him a "target" or hat badge worth 80 French crowns.

Christian IV made a voyage in the North Sea towards Norway in June 1597. Sinclair told a Scottish merchant that Christian IV would visit Scotland and Anne of Denmark should prepare a lodging for him in Kinloch's house near the gates of Holyrood Palace. Christian IV did not visit Scotland. In December 1597 Sinclair sent a letter to James VI. The English courtier Roger Aston read it and sent a summary to Sir Robert Cecil. Sinclair informed James VI that Christian IV of Denmark and other German princes would visit Scotland in the spring, and the queen's brother, the Duke of Holstein would come through and France and England and meet up. In the event, only Ulrik, Duke of Holstein turned up in Scotland.

From Frederiksborg Sinclair sent James VI notice of the coronation of Christian IV in 1596 in advance of a formal invitation by the diplomat Steen Bille, suggesting that if he could not come in person, the Duke of Lennox and two other noblemen would be suitable. The English ambassador Robert Bowes sent a copy of Sinclair's letter to William Cecil, suggesting the Earl of Crawford or Lord Sanquhar might go with the duke. In the event, James VI sent Lord Ogilvy and Peter Young.

After his marriage 1600, Sinclair left the court, and became a fief-holder in Skåne. Sinclair fought in the Kalmar war as captain of a company of the King's regiment of foot, and participated in the Danish capture of Öland. After the Danish capture of Kalmar he became military governor of the city.

== Political role ==
Andrew Sinclair came to London with Christian IV in June 1606, as a gentleman of the king's bedchamber with Corvitius Rud, and King James gave him a gold chain. Sinclair became involved in correspondence with Arbella Stuart and Margaret Howard, Countess of Nottingham when the Countess accused Christian IV of insulting her. Sinclair wrote to Arbella that Christian hoped she might defend his honour. In April 1608 Sinclair sent two Danish hounds to Prince Henry. On 20 April he wrote to the Earl of Salisbury thanking him for sending some money for him from King James, and asked for an annual pension with a patent letter written in Latin.

Sinclair was sent to London in February 1614 to discuss disputes in Lübeck and alliances. He spoke to the Venetian ambassador Antonio Foscarini about Denmark's ratification of an agreement between Brandenburg and Saxony. King James gave a diamond, which he had bought from George Heriot for £320. Christian IV visited England again in August 1614, coming incognito to surprise his sister at Denmark House, accompanied only by Sinclair and a page. It was said that Sinclair impersonated an ambassador and Christian IV pretended to be his servant or secretary.

Christian IV aggressive policy towards Sweden was met with reluctance and skepticism in Skåne, since the province would be the first to feel the impact of war in case of hostilities. The King needed faithful supporters in the province, and hence Sinclair was made colonel of the Scanian Regiment in 1615, and became recipient of a number of land donations. The following year he was made one of a very limited number of knights of the Order of the Armed Arm. In 1617 Sinclair became a member of the privy council of the Danish realm; the King needed loyal followers in that august body, as its resistance towards his foreign policy was mounting. He was the King's confidential adviser in matters concerning Great Britain, utilizing his many friends and connections to Danish advantage, especially James VI, with whom he was in great favour. Sinclair was the Danish King's envoy in Britain a number of times between 1606 and 1621, managing to influence James VI into adopting a more pro-Danish, and less pro-Swedish, stance. At the same time Sinclair acted as the British King's emissary at the Danish court. Sinclair was hosted in London by the German born goldsmith John Spilman.

== Personal life ==
In 1600, Sinclair married Kirsten Eriksdatter Kaas, in a ceremony at the Royal Palace. She was a maid of honour to the Queen, and of the Danish noble family af Sparre. Some sources name her as Sophie Eriksdatter Kaas, a daughter of Erik Kaas of Gjelskov and Anna Emmiksen, who was a maid of honour to Anne of Denmark, and assisted at her coronation in Edinburgh on 17 May 1590. Sophie Kaas intended to marry a Scottish courtier but he died before the wedding.

They had three sons, and one daughter; Jakob (James) Sinclair (who also served James VI), Johanne Andersdatter Sinclair, Erik Sinclair, and Christian Sinclair. Sinclair had Gladsaxehus as a fief, 1600–1620; Gislöv from 1613; Landskrona 1619–1621, then exchanged against Hammershus. The King gave him Sandby in Göinge as allodial possession; in the vicinity he began to build Sinclairsholm, which, however, was not completed until after his death. He also held Kronovall until his death.
