= Joachim von Bassewitz (administrator) =

German administrator, jurist and diplomat

Joachim von Bassewitz (died 1610) was a German administrator, jurist, and diplomat.

== Family ==
Born in Mecklenburg, he was a son of Joachim von Bassewitz (died 1568) and his wife Margarethe von Bülow. He had four brothers. In 1578, he married Anna von Bülow (died 1595), the daughter of Christoph von Bülow and Anna vam Lohe. They had seven children. On 17 April 1597, Joachim von Bassewitz married Anna Ilse von Schmecker (died 1621), the widow of Hans von Behr of Hilgendorf. They had three sons.

== Career ==
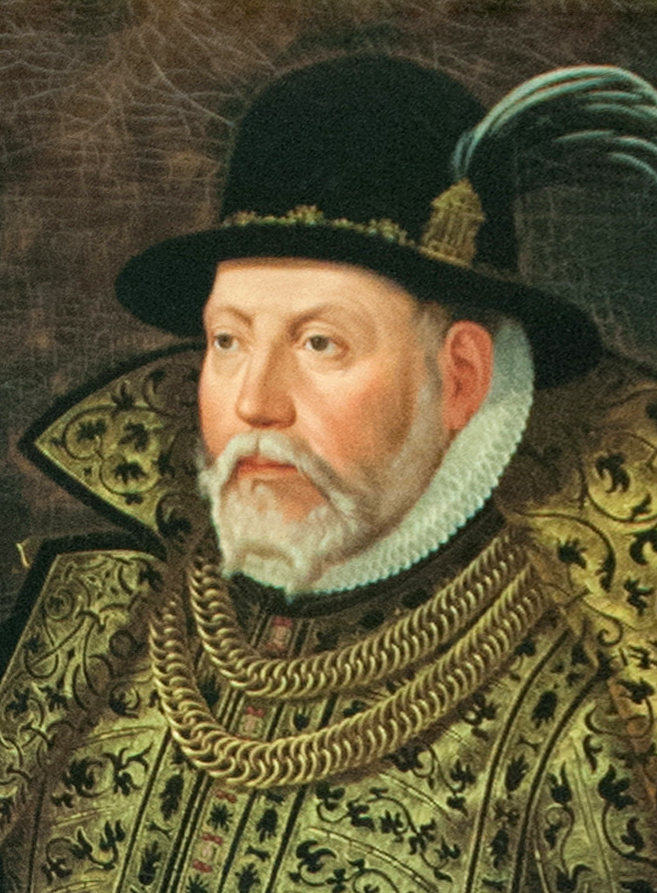
Ulrich, Duke of Mecklenburg was Bassewitz's employer

Joachim von Bassewitz studied at the University of Rostock in 1558, where he was matriculated as a nobleman, then in Wittenberg and in Leipzig. In 1560s he went on a Grand Tour to Italy with a relative. He signed the stammbuch of Georg Tetzel in 1565 in Ferrara.

In 1576, Joachim von Bassewitz was appointed as steward to the Mecklenburg princes, the two sons of John Albert I, John VII, Duke of Mecklenburg-Schwerin (1558–1592) and Sigismund August (1561–1600) at the University of Leipzig. That same year, for their uncle and guardian, Duke Ulrich of Mecklenburg, Joachim von Bassewitz and Hubertus Sieben zu Poischendorff and the notaries Herdingus Petri and Christoph Morder, compiled an inventory of all the princely fortifications, houses, and offices.

From 9 February 1577, Joachim von Bassewitz served as steward to Duke Ulrich and as a district administrator of Mecklenburg. In 1588, Duke Ulrich sent him to the wedding of Duke John VII, Duke of Mecklenburg-Schwerin and Princess Sophia of Holstein-Gottorp.

Bassewitz corresponded with the historian Arild Huitfeldt. Johannes Caselius dedicated a 1580 Rostock edition of Antonio Sanfelice's Campania to Bassewitz as a councillor to the Duke of Mecklenberg. Campania is a guide to the antiquity of Naples, Capua, and the Campania region. Some Latin letters from Caselius to Bassewitz were published.

Bassewitz became friends with the politician and poet Andreas Mylius, who sent him a poem in December 1587. The poem dealt with their shared scholarly and poetic endeavors, but also addressed the ailments of advancing age. In 1592, Mylius wrote four distichs against a contemporary who had criticized some of Joachim von Bassewitz's verses.

== Mission to Scotland ==
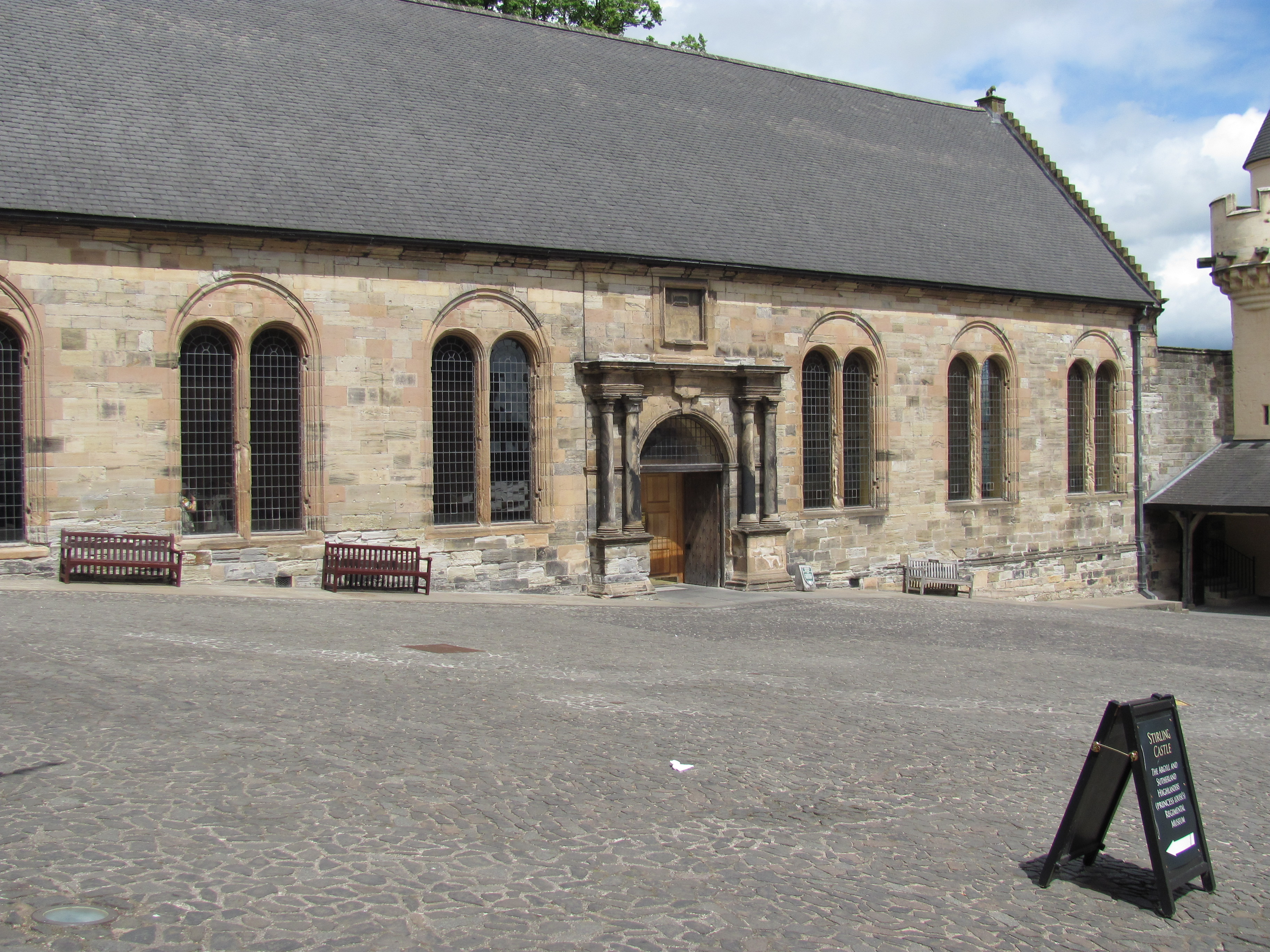
Bassewitz came to Stirling Castle in August 1594 for the baptism of Prince Henry

In 1594, Joachim was sent as an envoy to the Scottish royal court for the baptism of Prince Henry at Stirling Castle. Duke Ulrich was the grandfather of Anne of Denmark, consort of James VI of Scotland. Bassewitz and Adam Crusius (or Krause), the ambassador of Henry Julius, Duke of Brunswick-Lüneburg, arrived at Leith with 26 companions on 11 July 1594.

According to James Melville of Halhill, the Danish ambassadors arrived around the same time. When James VI sent a welcoming party to escort all these diplomats the short distance to Edinburgh, Bassewitz and Crusius felt this was below their dignity and demanded a convoy of their own.

Anne of Denmark, according to John Colville, did not greet them Edinburgh but travelled to Falkland Palace as the lodgings at Holyrood Palace were not in suitable condition for a grand reception. James VI gave Bassewitz an audience at Holyrood on 15 September. As protocol demanded, Bassewitz was seen last because the envoys from Denmark and Brunswick-Lüneburg took precedence.

There were at least three servants or courtiers from Mecklenburg in Anne of Denmark's Scottish household. These included Jacob the "Duke of Mecklenburg's lackey", Henninck Mildenitz, and a page William Belo who may have been a relative of Bassewitz as a member of the Bülow family. Bassewitz seems to have tried to intervene in Scottish politics, by attempting to speak with the English ambassador Robert Bowes on behalf the banished nobleman Francis Stewart, 5th Earl of Bothwell. Bowes heard that Bassewitz planned to ask the other diplomats to intercede with James VI for Bothwell for his restoration and place at court. Although Bassewitz was able to raise the issue with James in Edinburgh, James did not pardon Bothwell.

James Melville, his brother William Melville, Lord Tongland, and the King's Master of Household looked after the diplomats in Edinburgh as they waited for the delayed events to start. It was said the ambassadors in Edinburgh were "sumptuous in their householding" at the king's expense, so James VI asked landowners in Lothian to host them to save him money until they travelled to Stirling. At Stirling, Bassewitz and Crusius co-hosted a banquet for the other diplomats in the Palace at the castle.

Bassewitz brought a gifts for Prince Henry and his mother, including a chain or necklace for the Queen made up of rubies, chrysolites, and hyacinths, which he told the English diplomats represented the roses of York and Lancaster. It was suitable for Anne of Denmark to wear on the front of gown made in the French fashion, now current. For Prince Henry he brought a portrait miniature of the Duke of Mecklenburg encircled with diamonds, with four larger diamonds at the quarters, in a locket shaped like a book which opened to reveal scenes of the Annunciation and Nativity. Another chain of jewels and enamelled beasts had a pendant of a man riding a winged horse, (an emblem of Mecklenburg).

After the baptism, James VI gave Bassewitz a gold chain worth 300 crowns provided by his goldsmith Thomas Foulis. The ambassadors from Denmark, Steen Bille and Christian Barnekow, received heavier chains worth 400 crowns. Bassewitz left Edinburgh before 20 September.

Bassewitz remained in touch with Adrian Damman, a Dutch diplomat in Scotland, and was involved in the reception of the Scottish diplomats Peter Young and David Cunningham in 1598 who canvassed for support for James VI's claim to the throne of England. Bassevitz wrote to James VI in Latin after meeting Young and Cunningham. He said that James's letters were widely admired in Mecklenburg and compared his wise counsel to Homer's Nestor. Bassewitz signed his letter as Prefect of Dobbertin and hereditary lord of Levetzow (Lübow).

== Court councillor ==
In 1595, Joachim von Bassewitz was a court councillor of Mecklenburg and Denmark, and also a court councillor of Brunswick-Lüneburg. In 1596, he was Duke Ulrich of Mecklenburg's envoy to the Archbishopric of Bremen. In 1597, Duke Ulrich requested his court councillors Joachim von Bassewitz and Claus von Below to send their report on their Silesian journey. In late summer 1597, Dukes Ulrich and Sigismund August, as guardians of Dukes Johann Albrecht II and Adolph Friedrich I, asked Tycho Brahe for a loan of 10,000 thalers. On St. Bartholomew's Day, August 24, 1597, after extensive negotiations, a principal bond was issued with ten guarantors, including Joachim von Bassewitz and his cousins Khöne Wolfrath von Bassewitz zu Maslow and David von Bassewitz zu Dalwitz. Joachim von Bassewitz became dean of Schwerin in 1598 and was appointed cathedral provost of Schwerin by Duke Ulrich in 1599.

== Dobbertin ==
In 1588, Bassewitz was elected as the new monastery administrator for Dobbertin. Duke Ulrich issued the official confirmation and letter of appointment in Güstrow on 2 November 2, 1588. Dobbertin Abbey had become a Lutheran Damenstift in 1572. During Joachim von Bassewitz's tenure as monastery administrator, six witch trials were conducted under his direction at the Dobbertin monastery court between 1595 and 1602. Among these were death sentences by burning at the stake for Margarete Kagen and Lena Hovemann for witchcraft and sorcery.

== Death ==
Joachim von Bassewitz died on February 20, 1610, at Medewege near Schwerin and was buried on February 24, 1610, in the monastery cemetery in Dobbertin.
