= Adam Crusius =

German diplomat

Adam Crusius or Crause, or Kruse (died 1608) was a German diplomat in the service of the Duke of Braunschweig-Lüneburg. He was from Bortfeld.

== Life and career ==
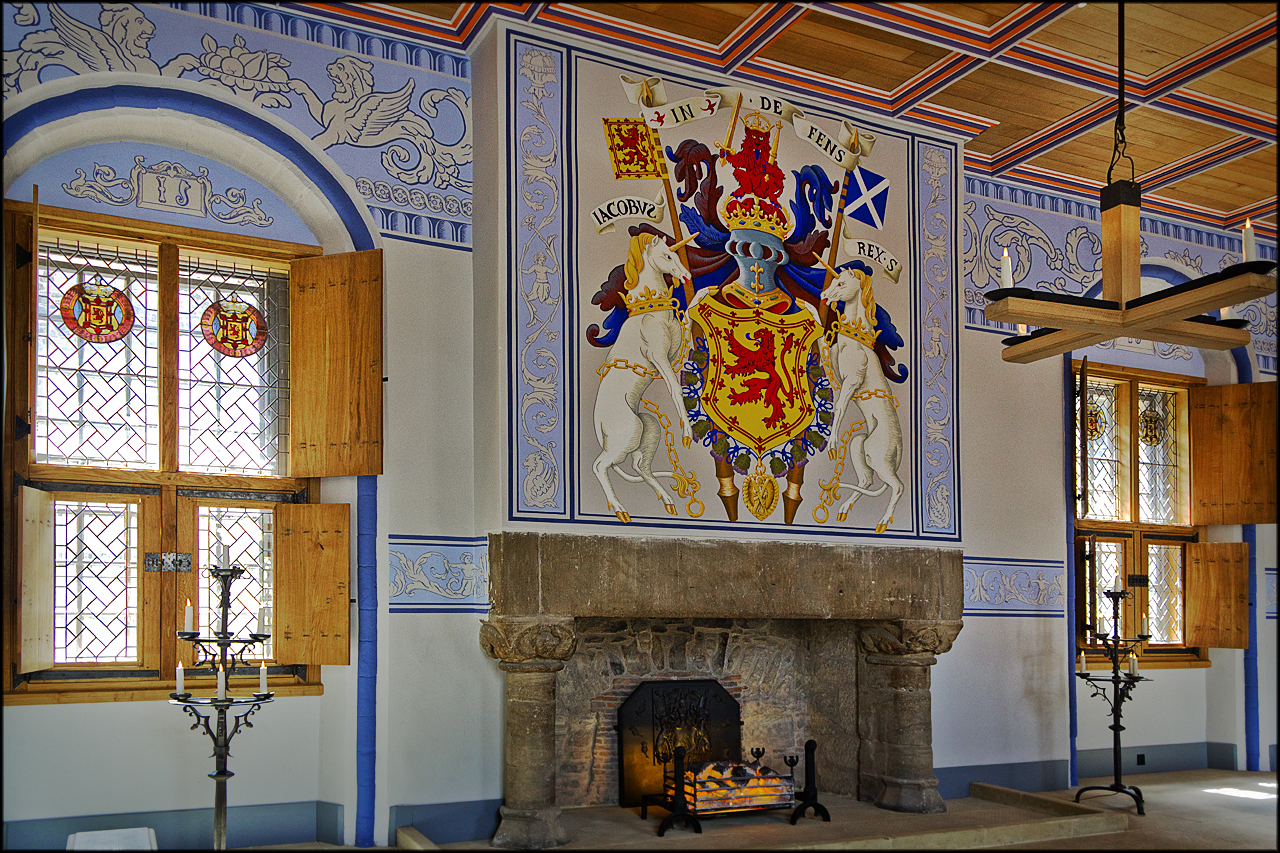
Adam Crusius hosted a banquet in the palace at Stirling Castle for the ambassadors in August 1594

He studied at the Universities of Rostock and Helmstedt. In August 1594 he was sent to the baptism of Prince Henry at Stirling Castle as the representative of the Duke of Brunswick. He attended a banquet in the Great Hall of Stirling Castle, and James VI danced for the ambassadors. A few days after, Crusius and Joachim von Bassewitz, the ambassador from Mecklenburg, co-hosted a banquet for the other diplomats in the Palace at the castle.

Crusius presented a chain of gold pea-pods enameled with green, with a locket containing a miniature portrait of the Duke of Brunswick and the story of Diana and Actaeon on the lid, and a chain made of gold whelk shells for Anne of Denmark. James VI of Scotland gave Crusius a gold chain weighing 30 ounces worth 300 French crowns provided by Thomas Foulis.

He came to England for the coronation of King James in July 1603 and was lodged at Twickenham Park. The Venetian diplomat Giovanni Carlo Scaramelli noted that, as an envoy of a relative of the queen, Crusius was lodged at the king's expense, at Kingston upon Thames. He attended a royal banquet with the Danish ambassadors on 5/15 August, where the toasts were given in German fashion. The banquet marked the anniversary of the king's rescue from the Gowrie Conspiracy.

He died in 1608. Johannes Caselius published an elegy.
