= Langenhagen, Mecklenburg-Vorpommern =

Langenhagen
- Ortsteil of Techentin
- Interactive map of Langenhagen
- Location within Germany Location within Mecklenburg-Vorpommern
- Coordinates: 53°34′N 12°02′E
- Country: Germany
- State: Mecklenburg-Vorpommern
- District: Ludwigslust-Parchim
- Town: Techentin
- Subdivisions: 2

Area
  - Total: 8.67 km^{2} (3.35 sq mi)
- Elevation: 60 m (200 ft)

Population (2006-12-31)
  - Total: 144
  - Density: 16.6/km^{2} (43.0/sq mi)
- Time zone: UTC+01:00 (CET)
  - Summer (DST): UTC+02:00 (CEST)
- Postal codes: 19399
- Dialling codes: 038736
- Vehicle registration: PCH

Langenhagen is a village and a former municipality in the Ludwigslust-Parchim district, in Mecklenburg-Vorpommern, Germany. Since 7 June 2009, it is part of the municipality Techentin.
