= Dobbertin Abbey =

Coordinates: 53°36′54″N 12°04′39″E

Dobbertin Abbey church

Dobbertin Abbey (Kloster Dobbertin) is a former monastery, which from approximately 1220 to approximately 1235 accommodated a community of Benedictine monks, from approximately 1235 a community of Benedictine nuns, and from 1572 a women's collegiate foundation, located in the municipality of Dobbertin near Goldberg in the district of Ludwigslust-Parchim in Mecklenburg-Vorpommern, Germany. It stands on a spit of land in the Dobbertiner See and includes the only church with two towers in Mecklenburg.

== History ==
The abbey was founded during the Christianisation of Germany in about 1220 by Prince Heinrich Borwin II of Mecklenburg and was the first field monastery in Mecklenburg. The founder gave it to the Benedictines for a community of monks. 15 years later it was turned into a Benedictine nunnery.

In 1549 the Landtag at Sagsdorf Bridge near Sternberg resolved to introduce the Lutheran Reformation into Mecklenburg. Despite violent resistance the abbey was secularised and in 1572 converted into a Lutheran collegiate foundation for noblewomen (Damenstift).

In the middle of the 19th century the church was restored by Georg Adolf Demmler to plans by Karl Friedrich Schinkel. The work was completed in 1857.

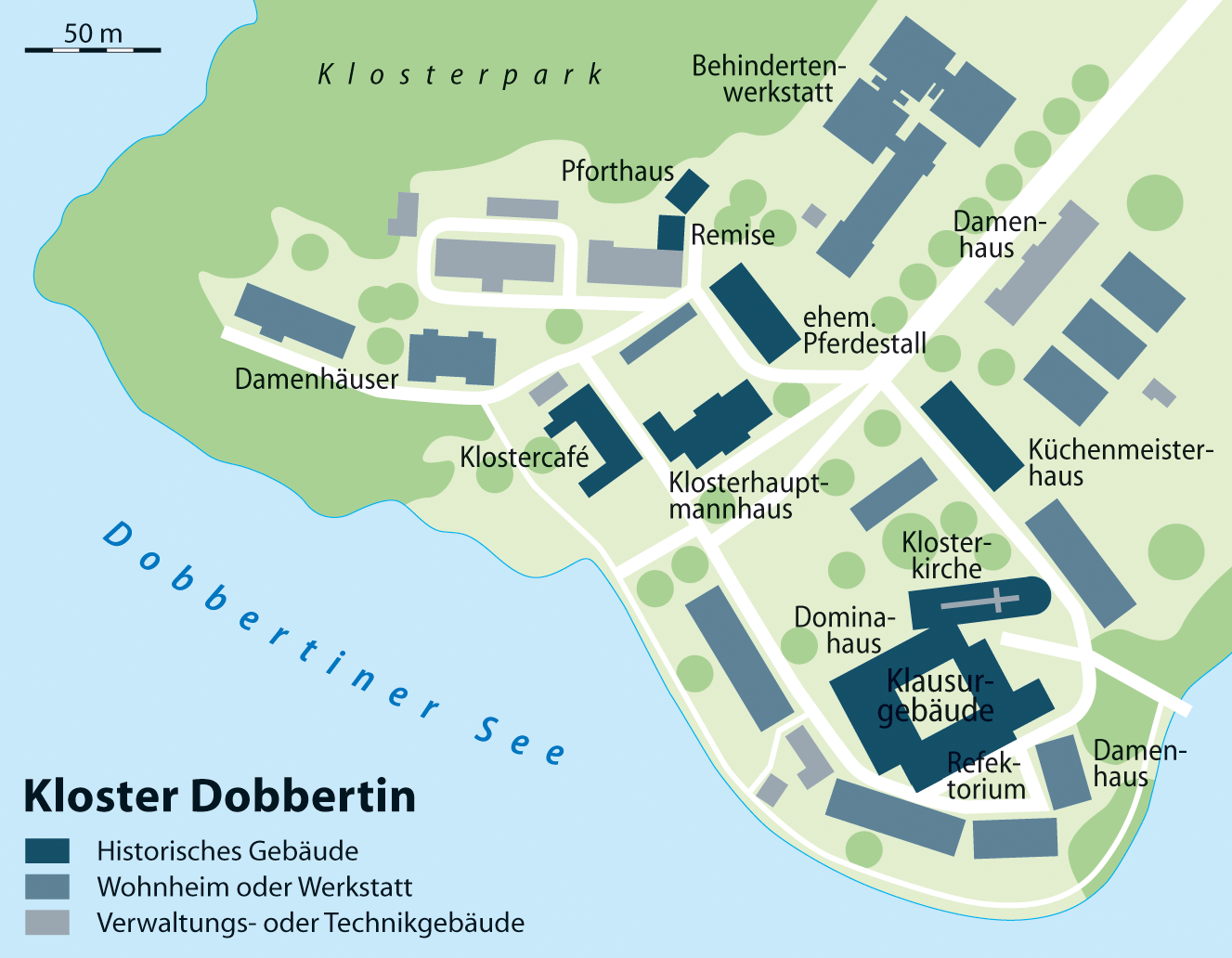
Map of the abbey complex

In 1918 the abbey premises became the property of the state and were converted into a youth hostel. After World War II Soviet troops were stationed here, and destroyed much of historical interest.

== Present use ==
From 1947 to 1991 the buildings were used as an old people's residential and care home. Then they were transferred to the responsibility of the charitable organisation of the German Evangelical Church (the Diakonisches Werk der Evangelischen Kirche in Deutschland e. V, or Diakoniewerk for short), who set up a care home for the severely physically handicapped. Workshops for the handicapped are still located here. It is possible to visit them, to take part in tours and to buy items made by residents. There is also a café with a view over the Dobbertiner See, and regular concerts are held. The former abbey also offers help for the aged, and counselling on debt and addiction.

Since 1991 the grounds, buildings and church have been refurbished, with help from the Deutsche Stiftung Denkmalschutz and the Deutsche Bundesstiftung Umwelt. The abbey is a protected historical monument.

== Images ==
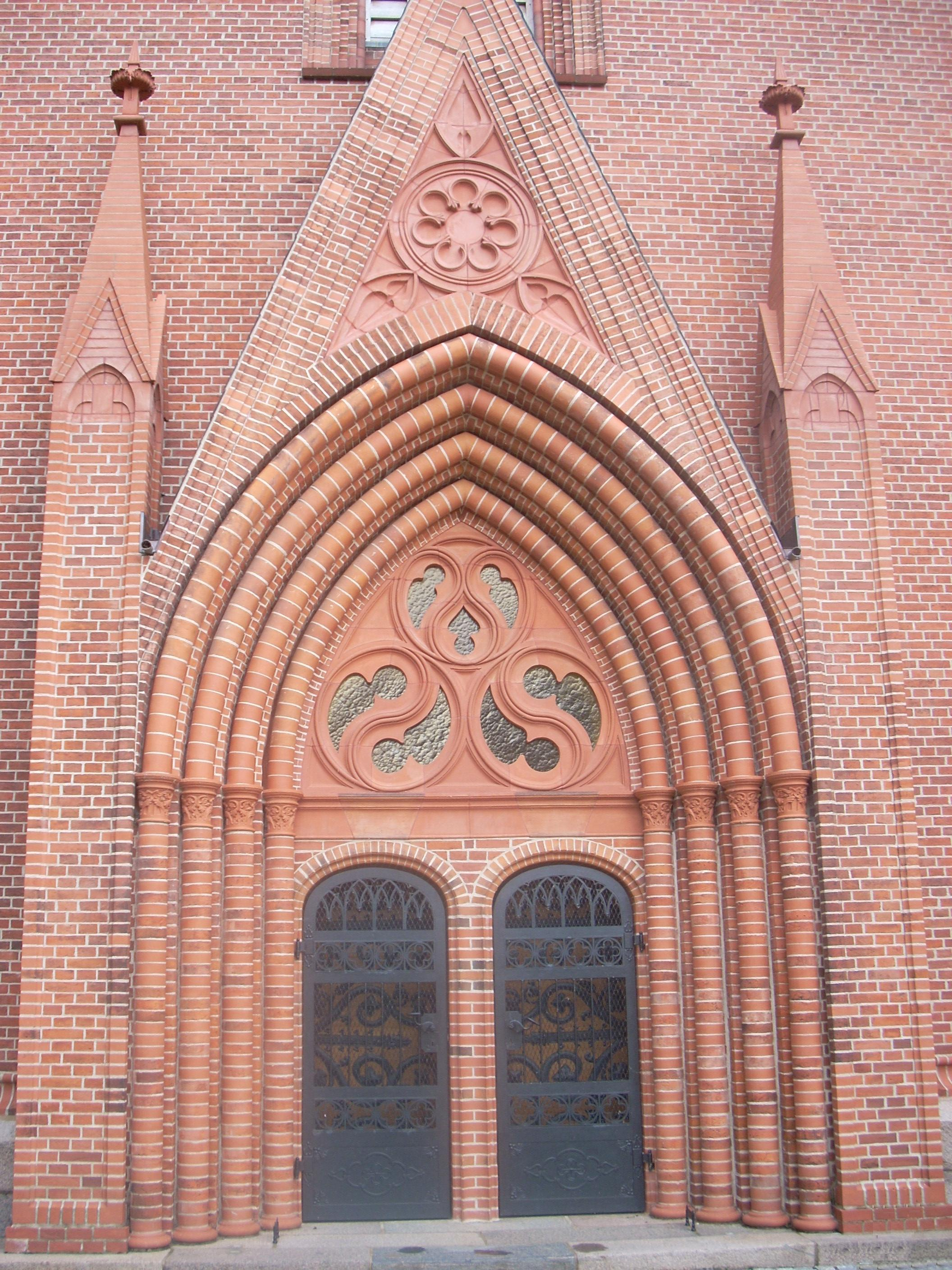
Portal of the abbey church

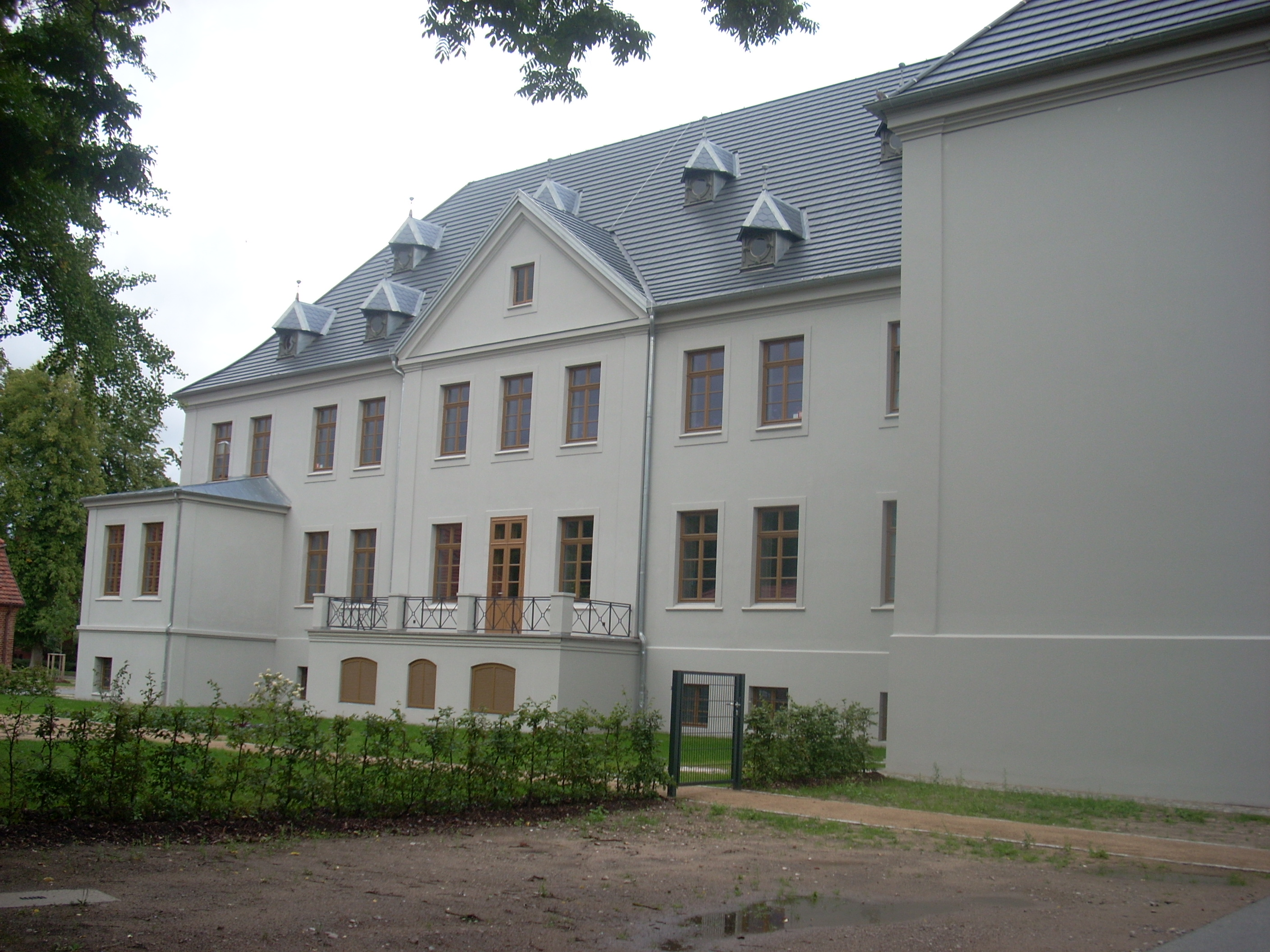
Abbey Administration

== Sources and external links ==
- Diakoniewerk Kloster Dobbertin official website (in German)
