= Dobbertin =

- Municipality
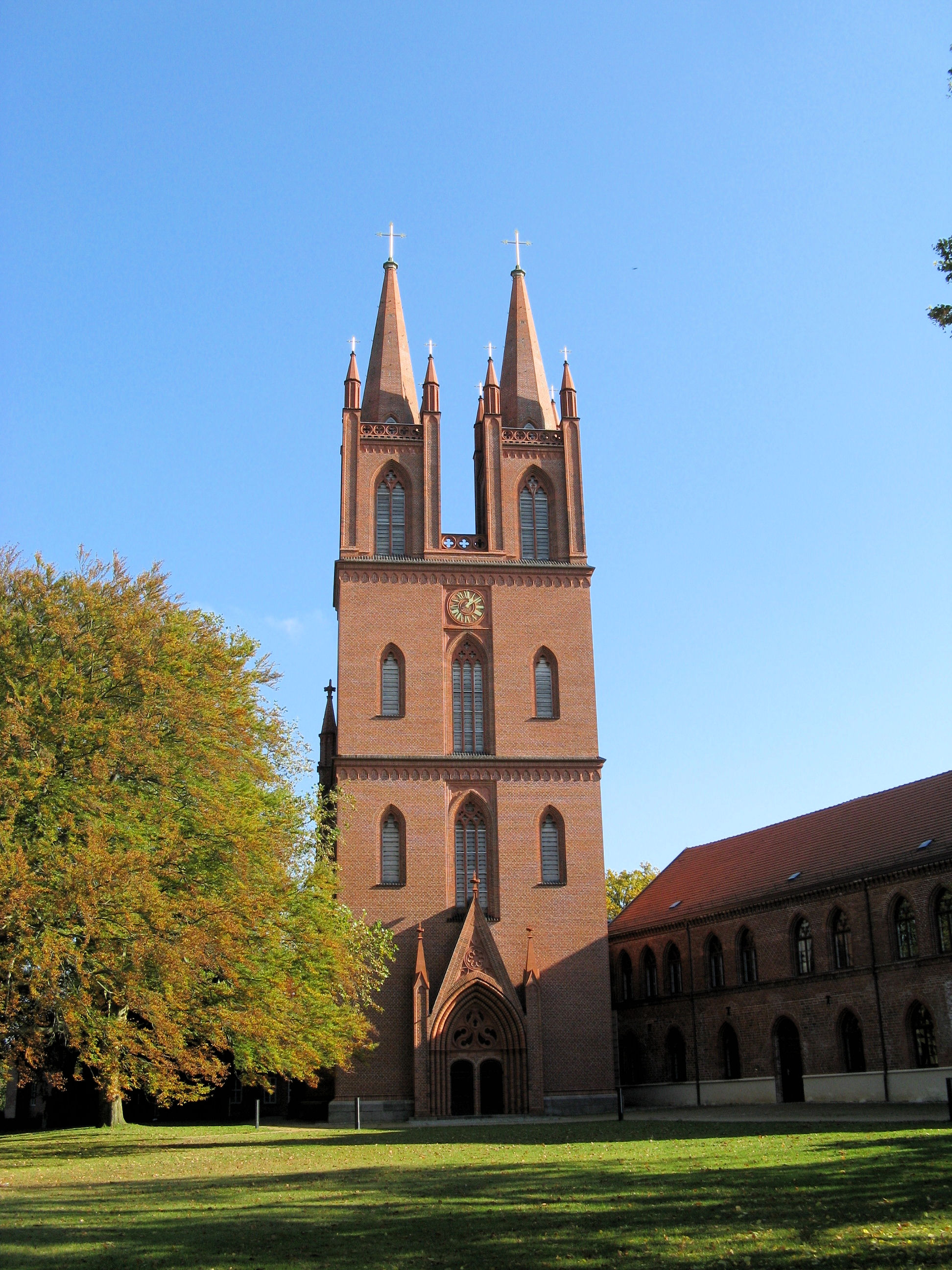
- Church in the monastery

- Coat of arms

- Location of Dobbertin within Ludwigslust-Parchim district
- Interactive map of Dobbertin
- Location within Germany Location within Mecklenburg-Vorpommern
- Coordinates: 53°38′N 12°04′E
- Country: Germany
- State: Mecklenburg-Vorpommern
- District: Ludwigslust-Parchim
- Municipal assoc.: Goldberg-Mildenitz
- Subdivisions: 9

Government
  - Mayor: Horst Tober

Area
  - Total: 58.97 km^{2} (22.77 sq mi)
- Elevation: 45 m (148 ft)

Population (2025-12-31)
  - Total: 1,034
  - Density: 17.53/km^{2} (45.41/sq mi)
- Time zone: UTC+01:00 (CET)
  - Summer (DST): UTC+02:00 (CEST)
- Postal codes: 19399
- Dialling codes: 038736
- Vehicle registration: PCH
- Website: gemeinde.dobbertin.de

Dobbertin is a municipality in the Ludwigslust-Parchim district, in Mecklenburg-Vorpommern, Germany. An important sight is Dobbertin Abbey. The municipality is situated in a landscape with many lakes and woods. It stands on the largest lake in the area, the Dobbertiner See.

== Notable people ==
- Christa Merten (1944–1986), athlete
- Rainer Podlesch (born 1944), retired cyclist
