= Mestlin =

- Municipality
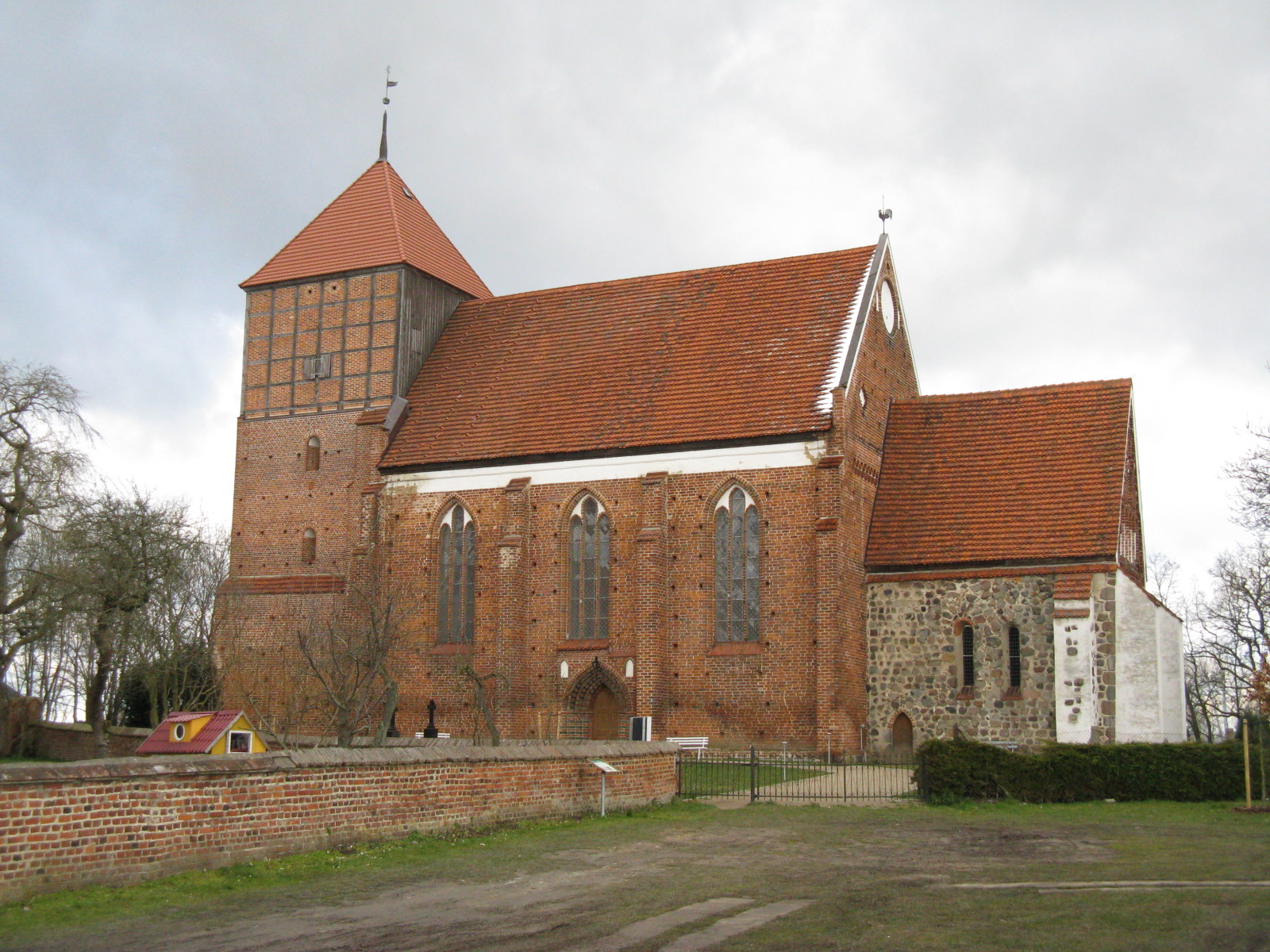
- Medieval church

- Location of Mestlin within Ludwigslust-Parchim district
- Interactive map of Mestlin
- Location within Germany Location within Mecklenburg-Vorpommern
- Coordinates: 53°34′N 11°56′E
- Country: Germany
- State: Mecklenburg-Vorpommern
- District: Ludwigslust-Parchim
- Municipal assoc.: Goldberg-Mildenitz
- Subdivisions: 4

Government
  - Mayor: Uwe Schultze

Area
  - Total: 32.56 km^{2} (12.57 sq mi)
- Elevation: 63 m (207 ft)

Population (2025-12-31)
  - Total: 751
  - Density: 23.1/km^{2} (59.7/sq mi)
- Time zone: UTC+01:00 (CET)
  - Summer (DST): UTC+02:00 (CEST)
- Postal codes: 19374
- Dialling codes: 038727
- Vehicle registration: PCH
- Website: www.mestlin.de

Mestlin is a municipality in the Ludwigslust-Parchim district, in Mecklenburg-Vorpommern, Germany. In the 1950s it was desired to make a socialist model village of it. So the Marx-Engels-Place was built, framed by shops, blocks of flats, a large school building and a monumental neoclassicist "Kulturhaus" (hall for public events).

== Gallery ==
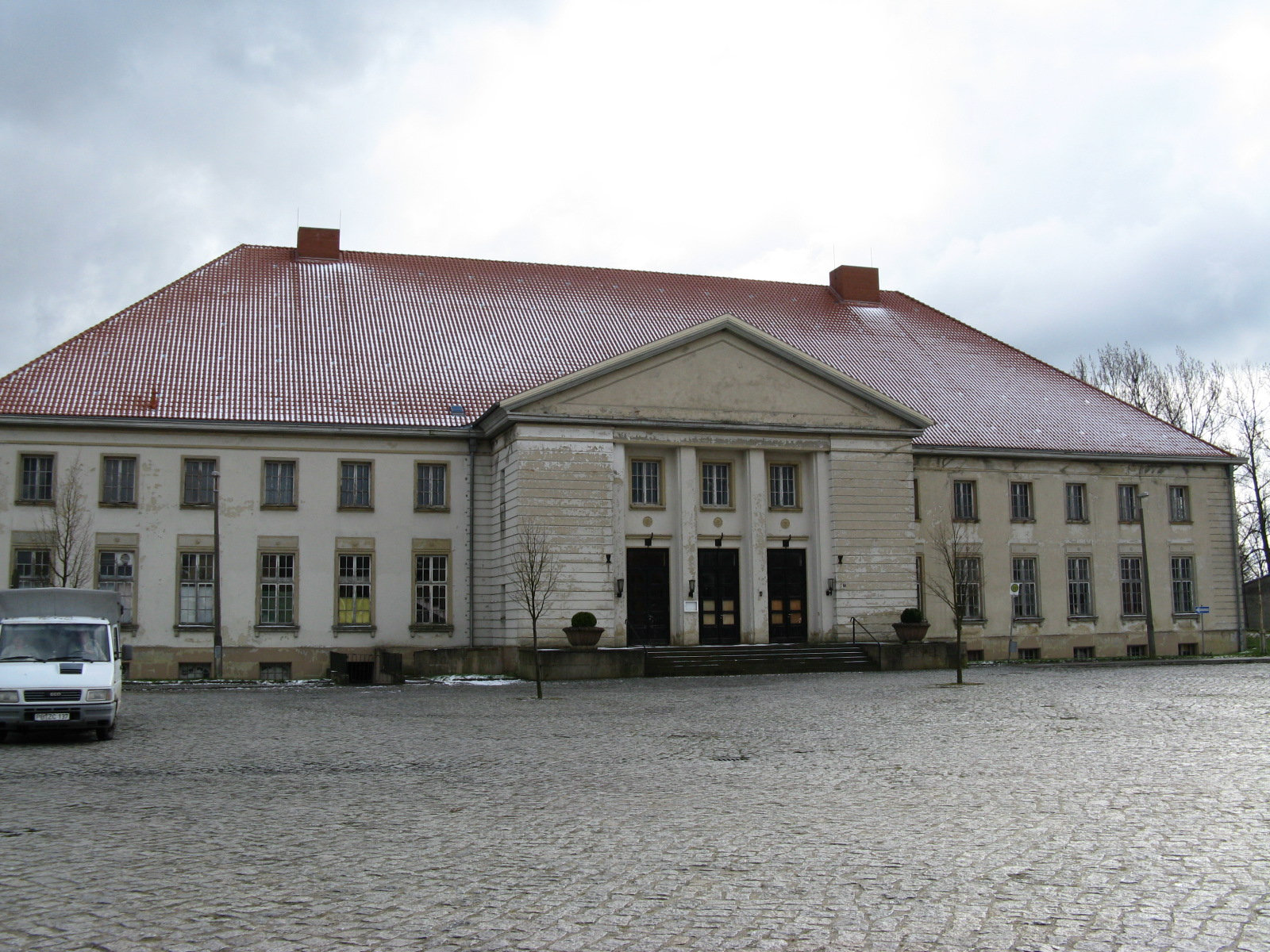
Mestlin: Kulturhaus

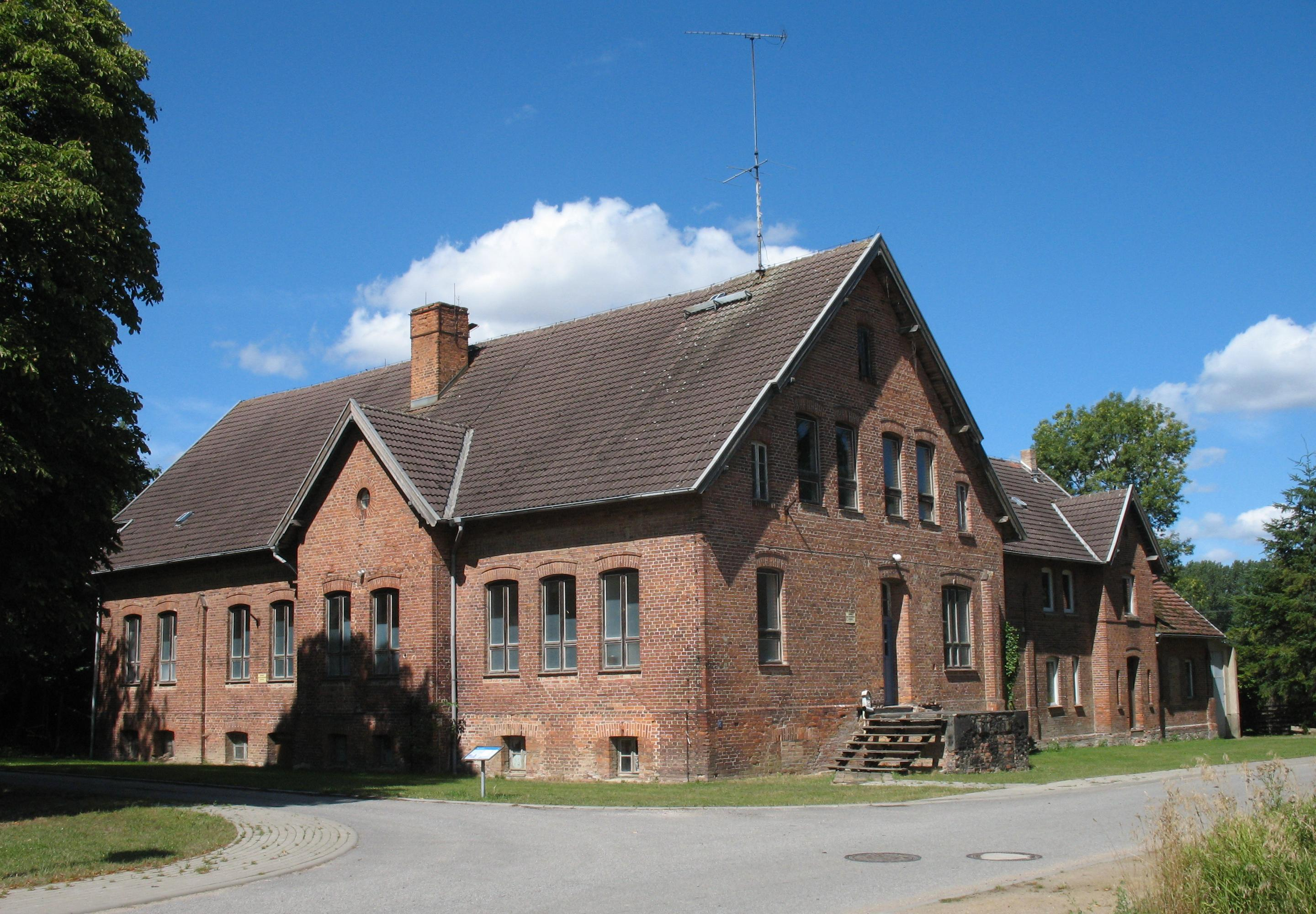
Manor house

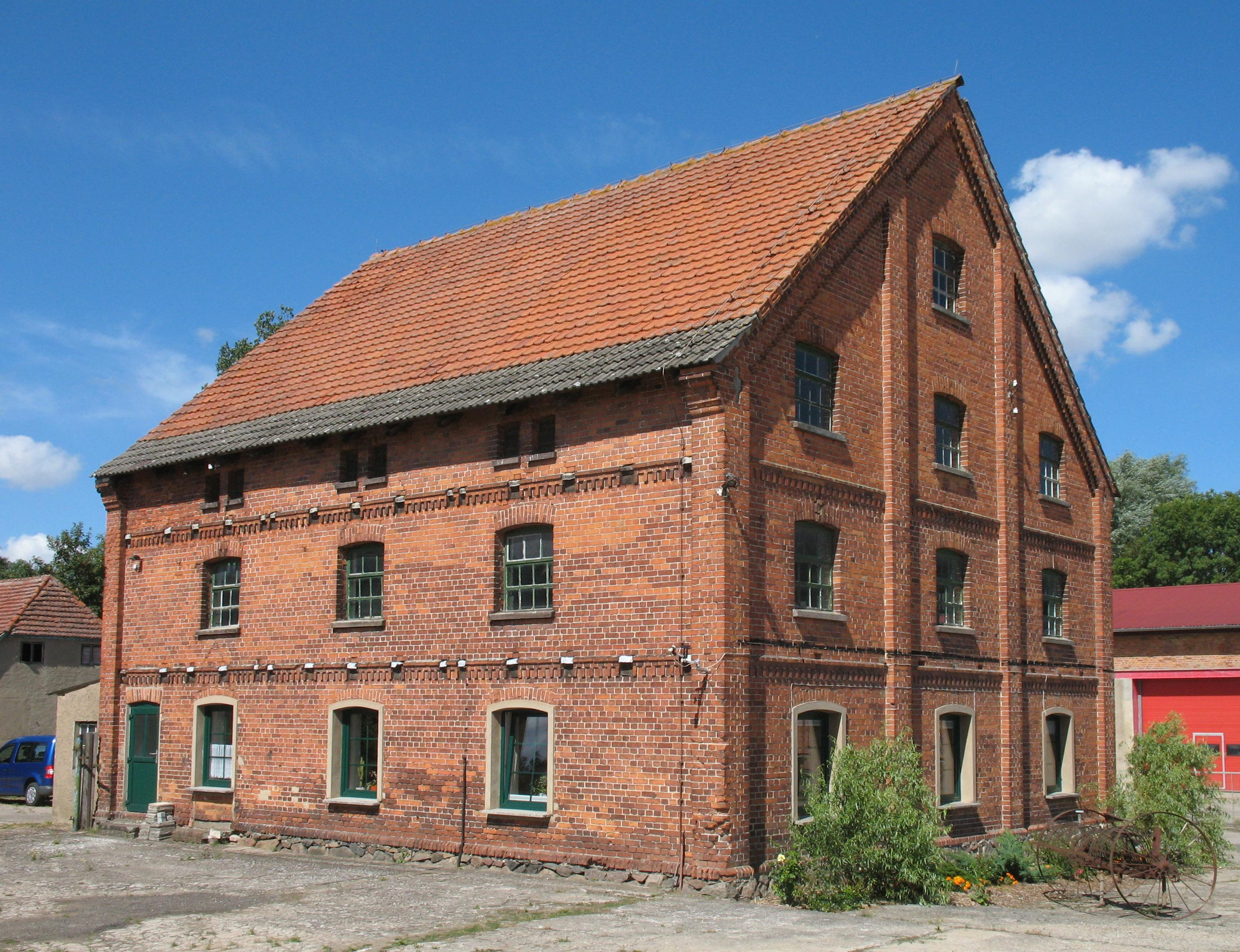
Storehouse

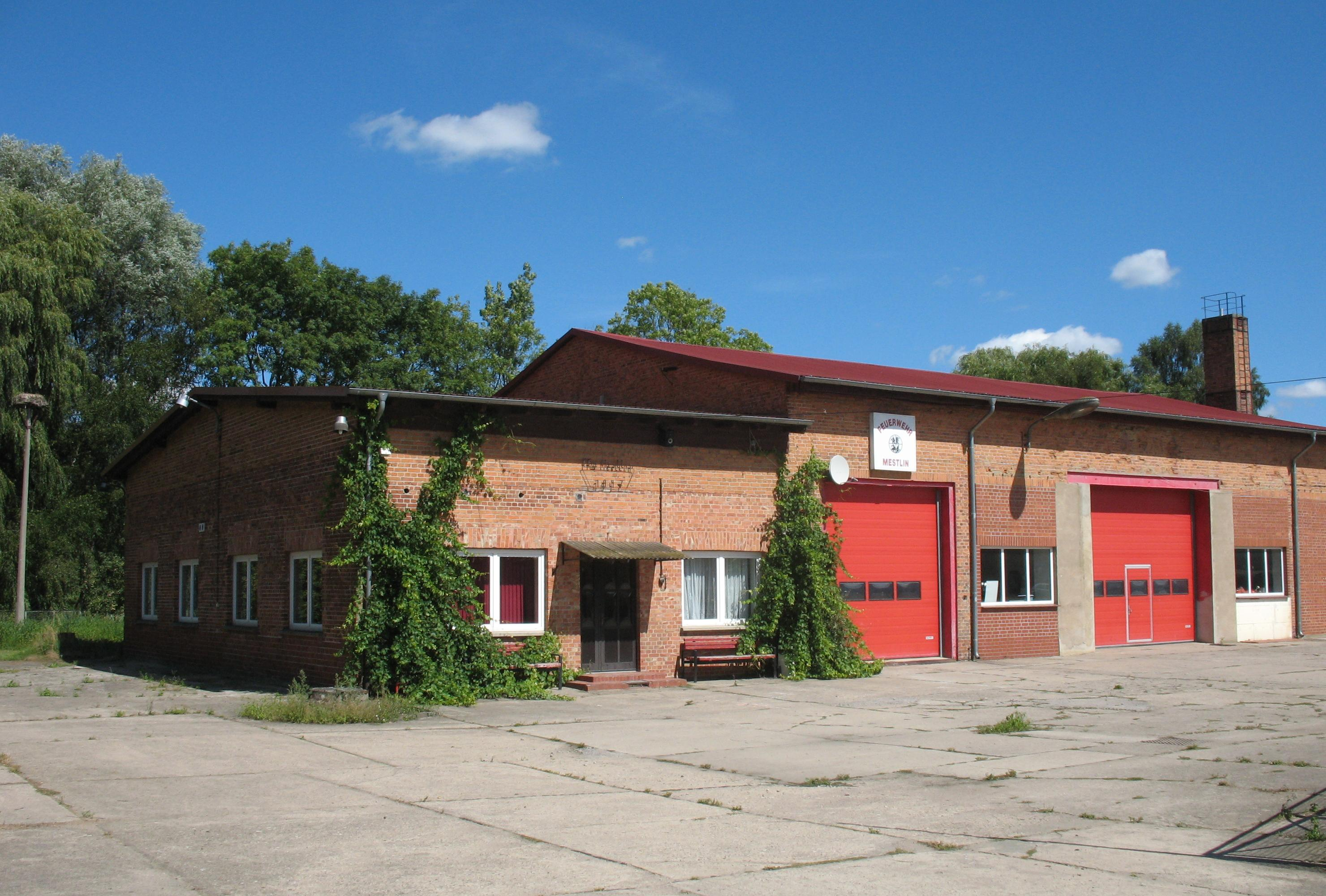
Fire station

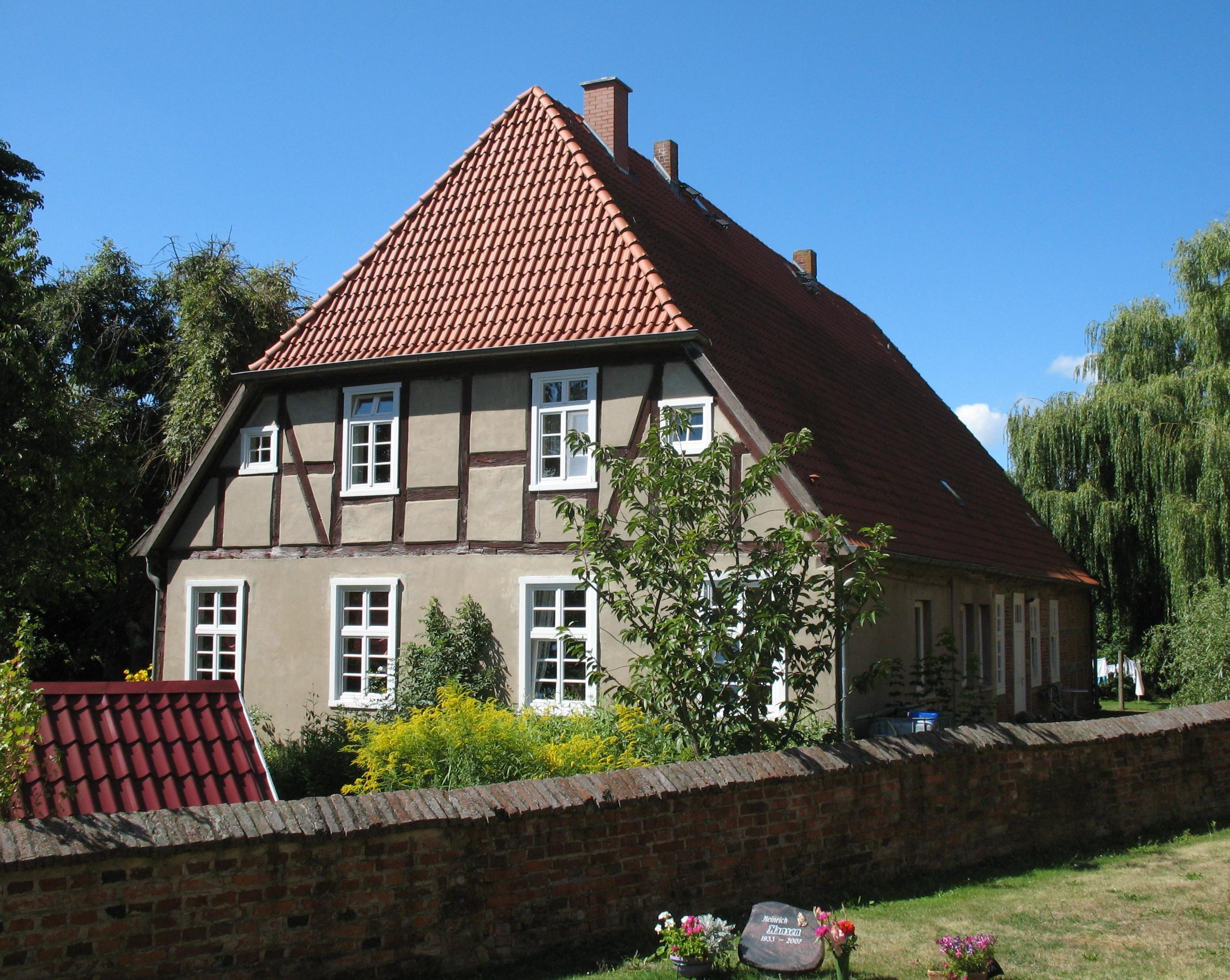
Rectory

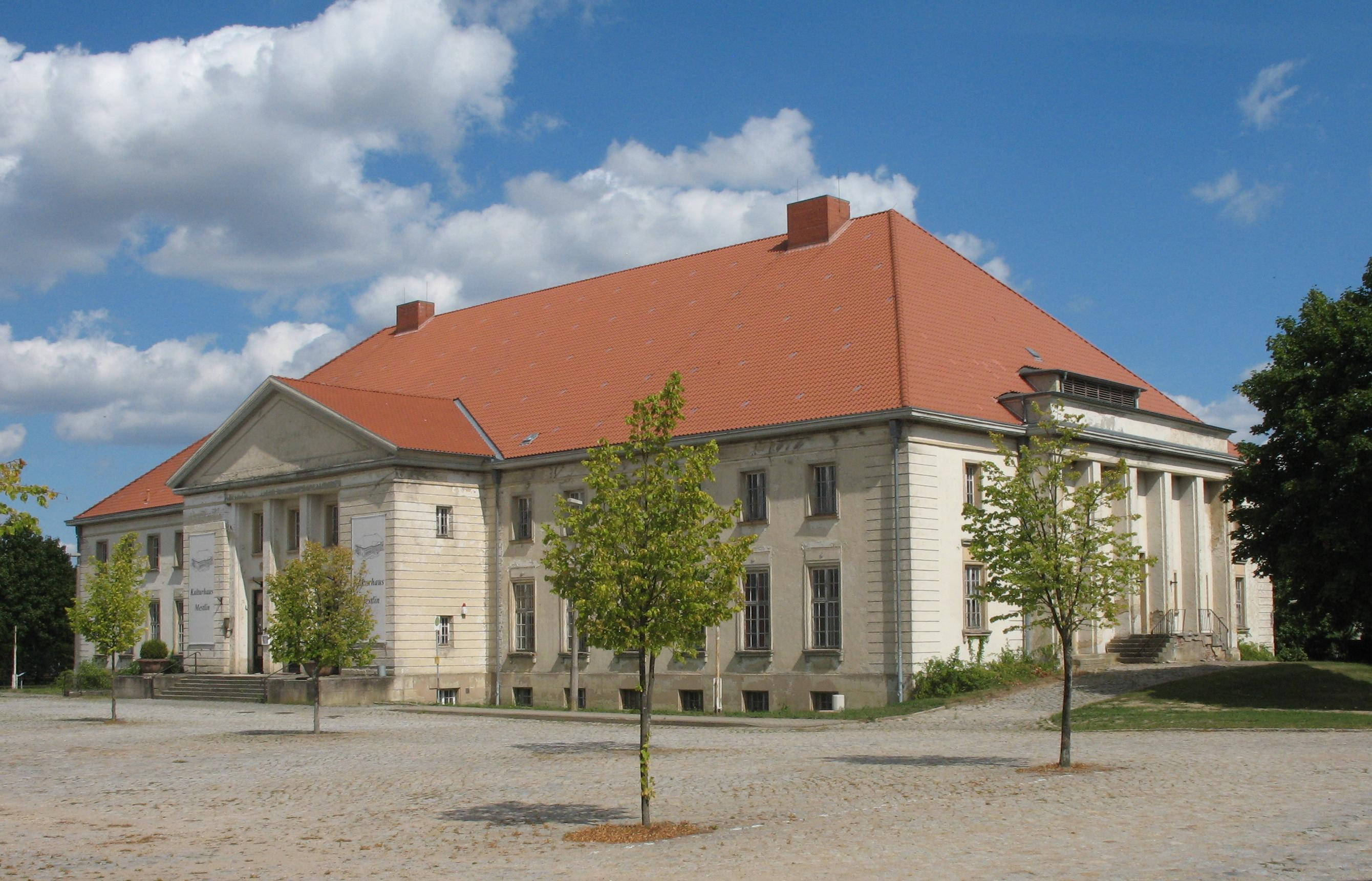
Cultural Centre

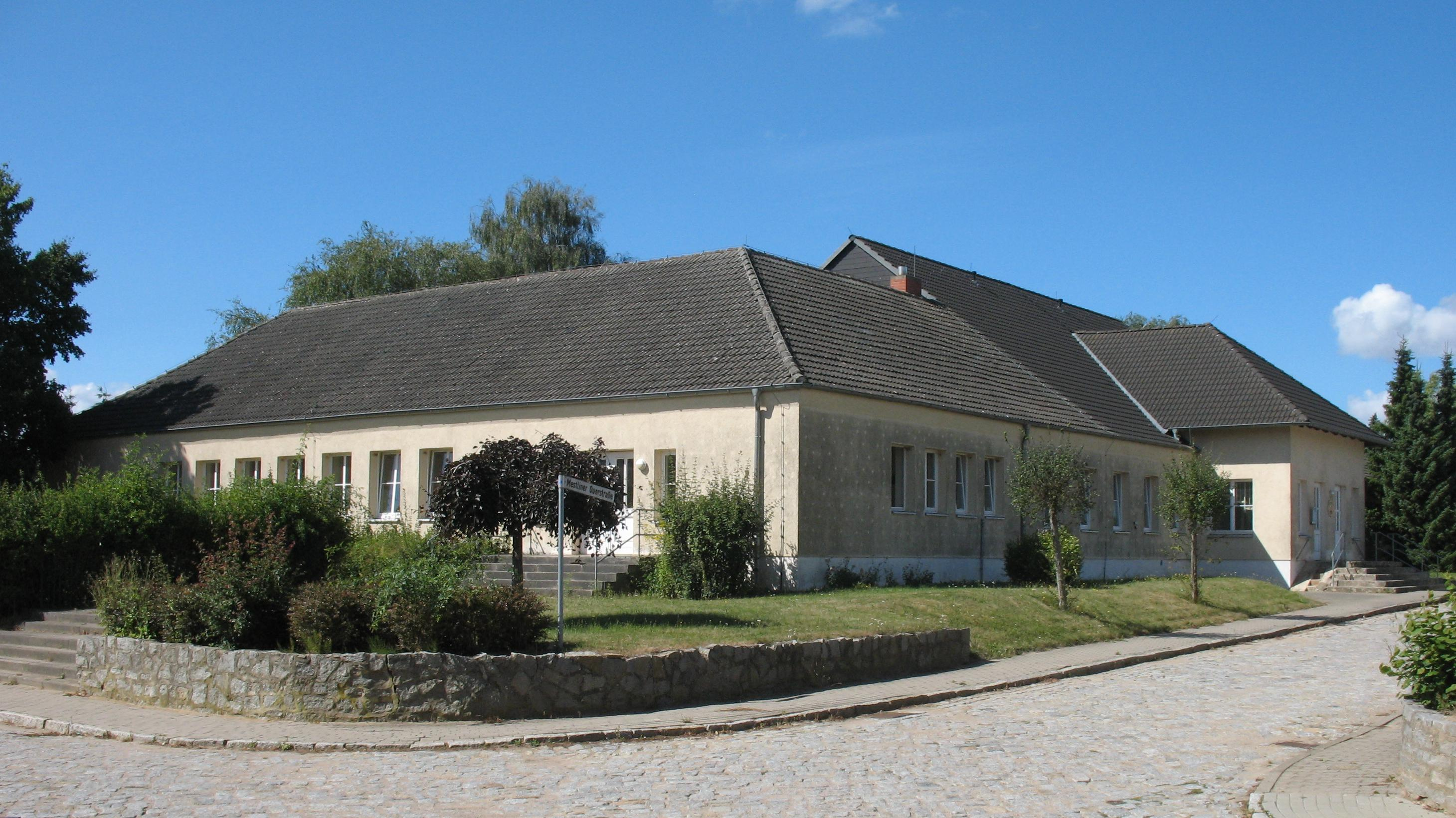
Kindergarten

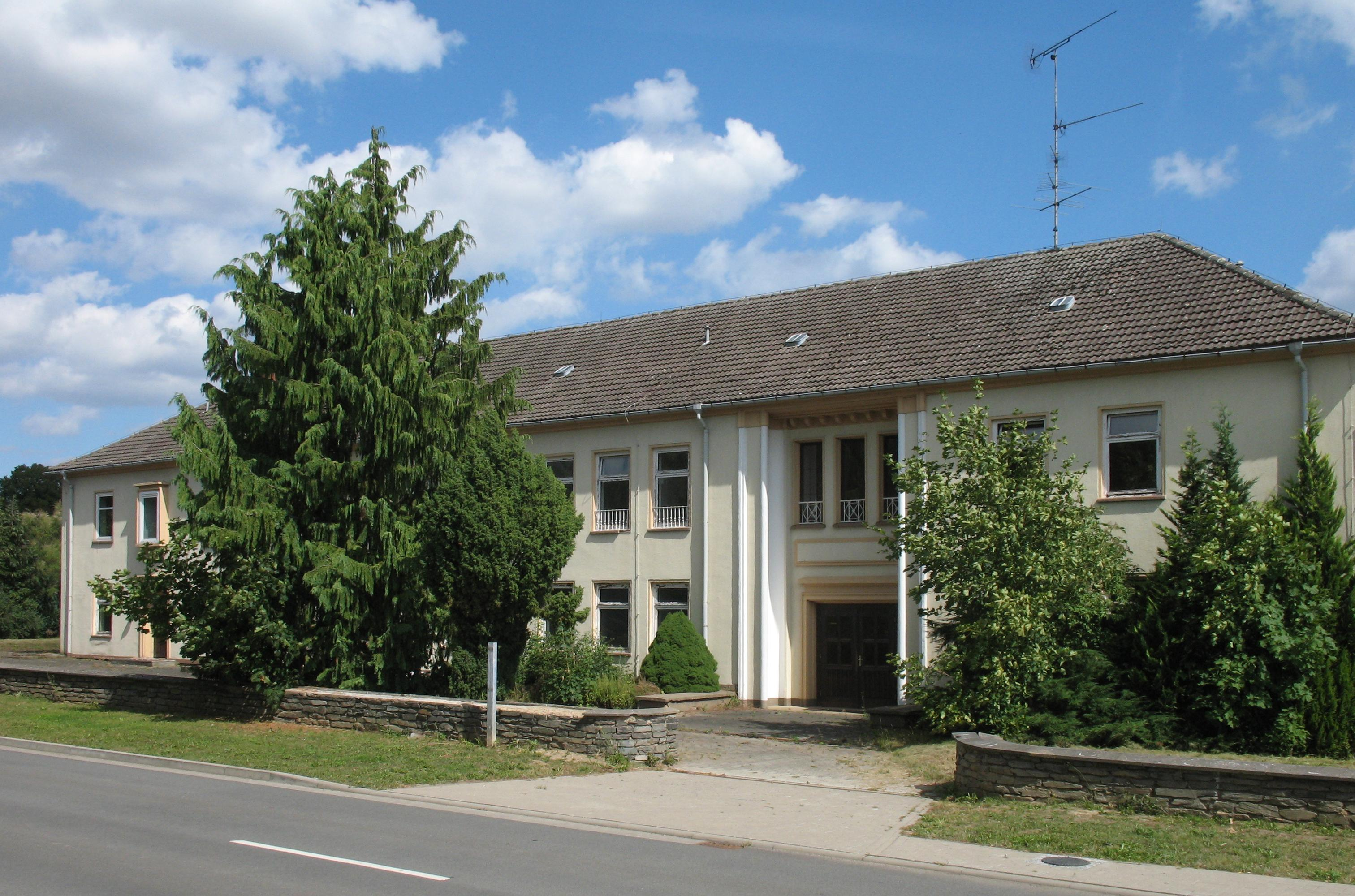
Former policlinic

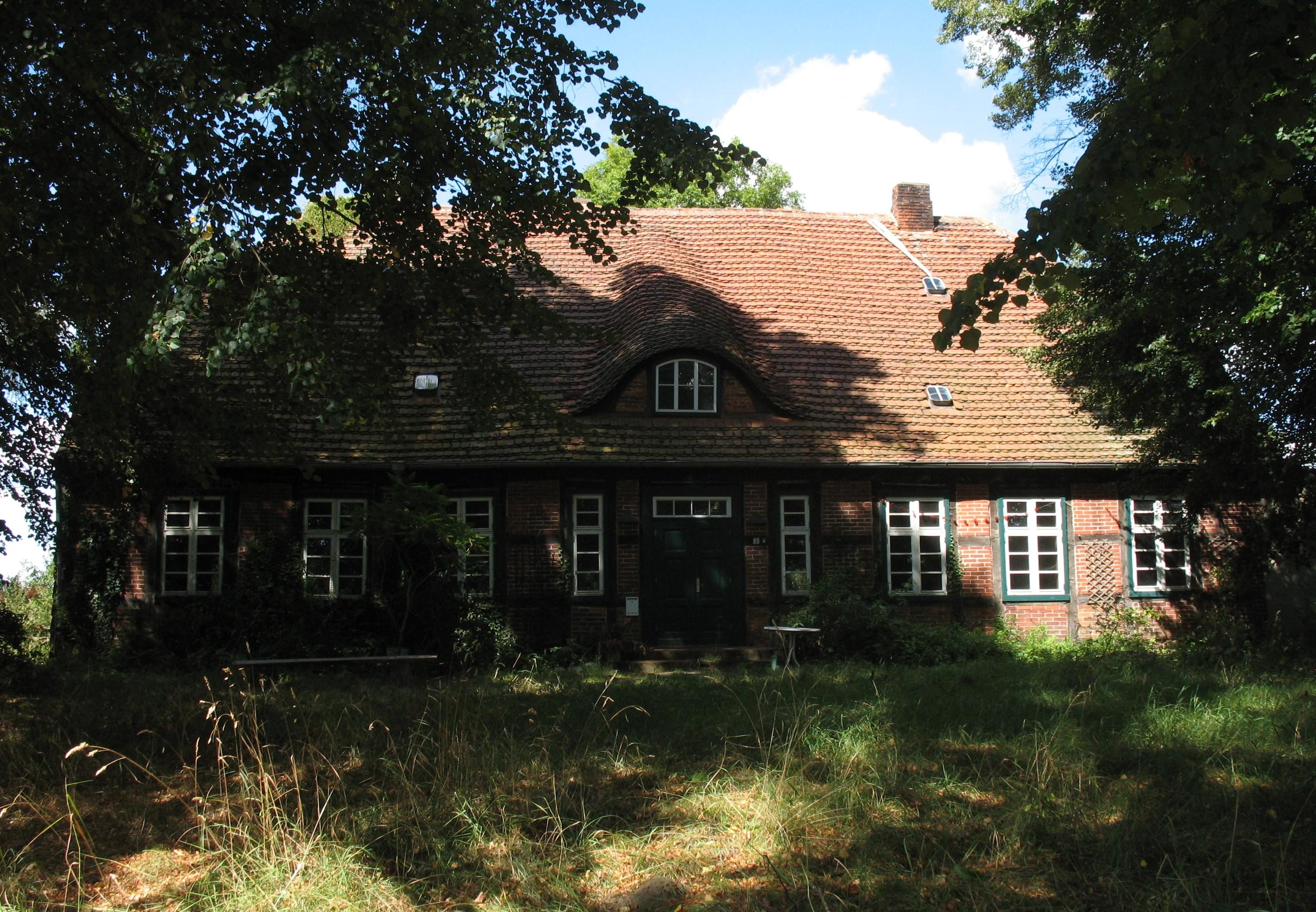
Former forester's lodge
Ruest

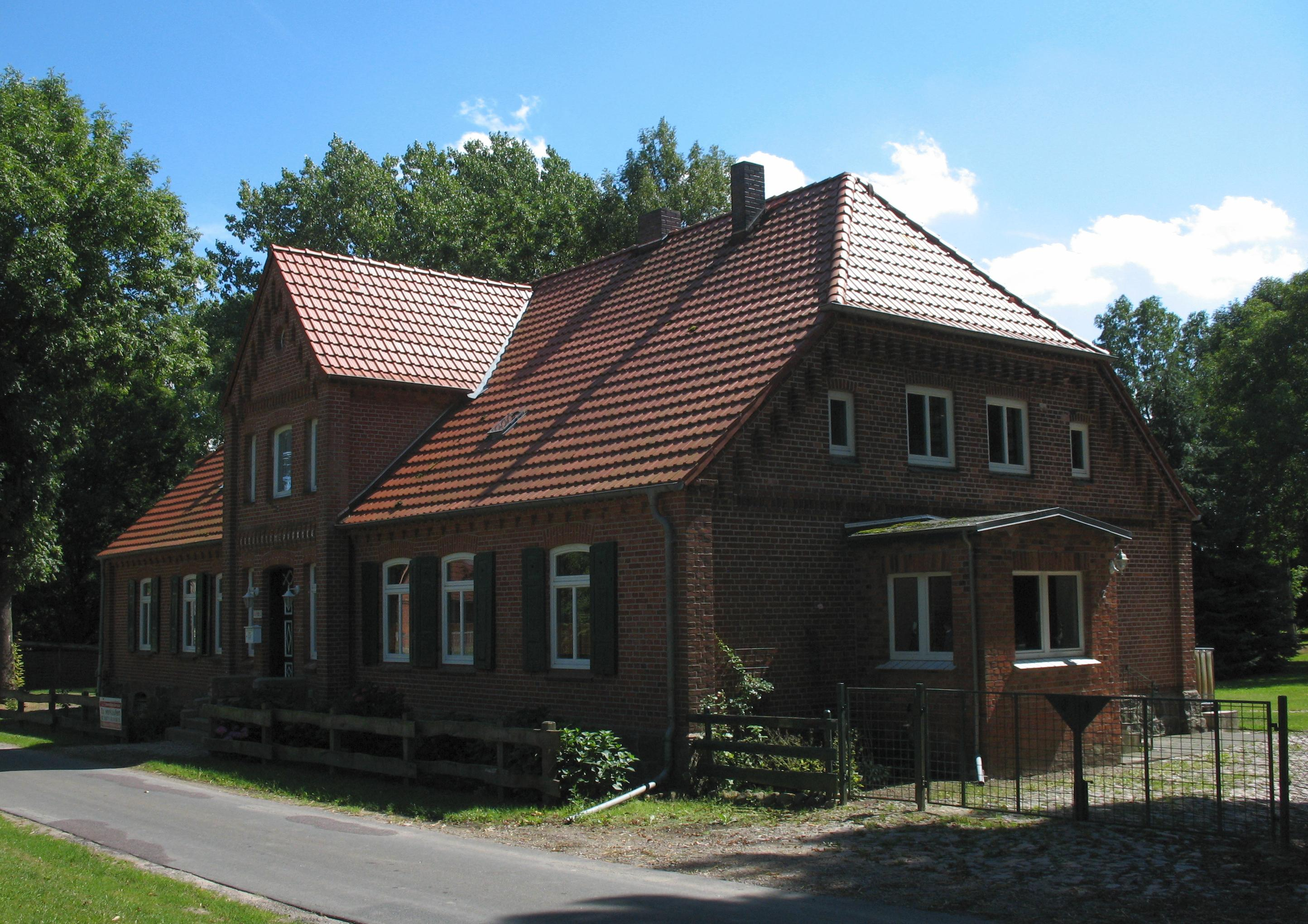
Dorfstr. 2

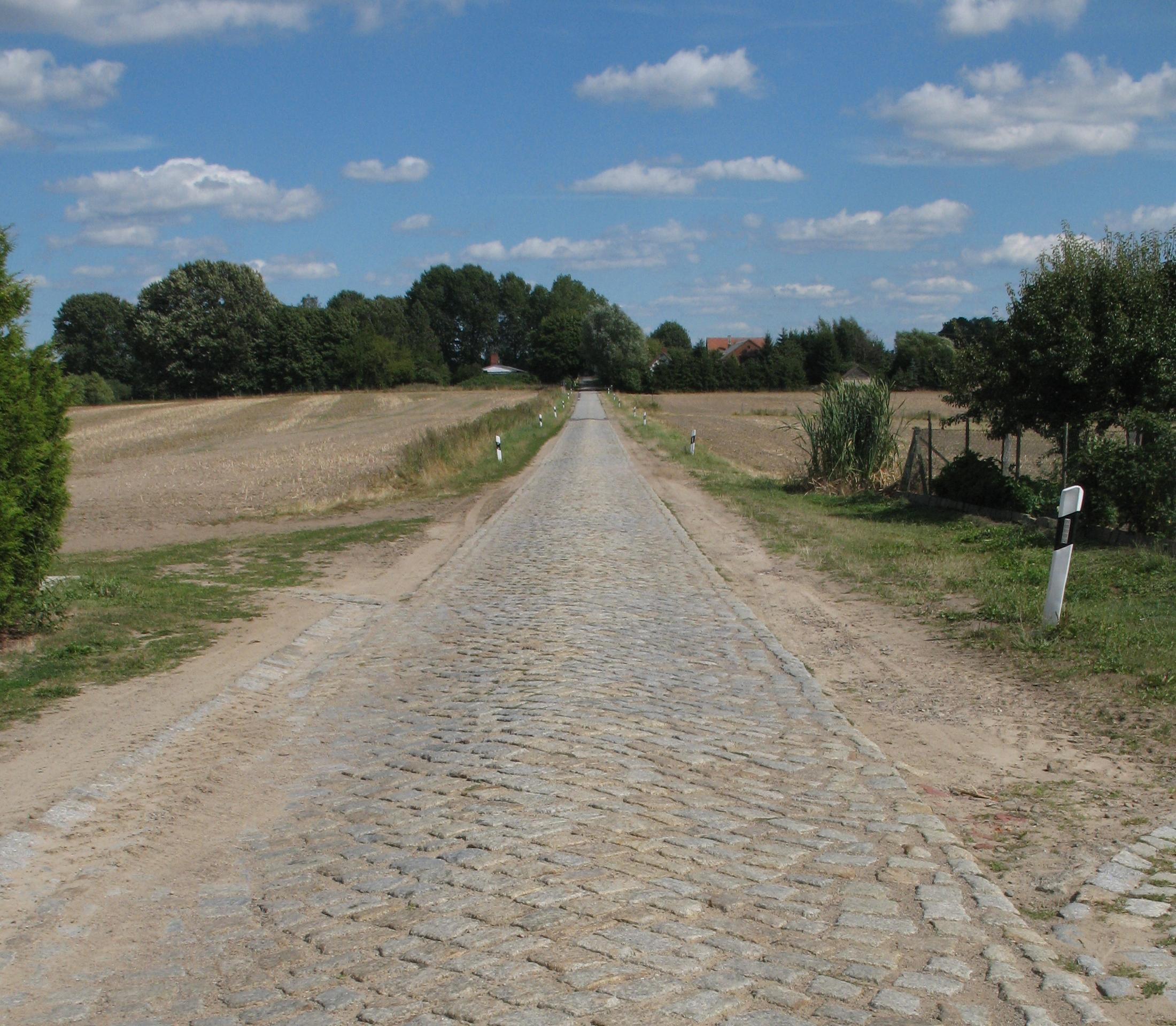
Cobblestone near Ruester Krug

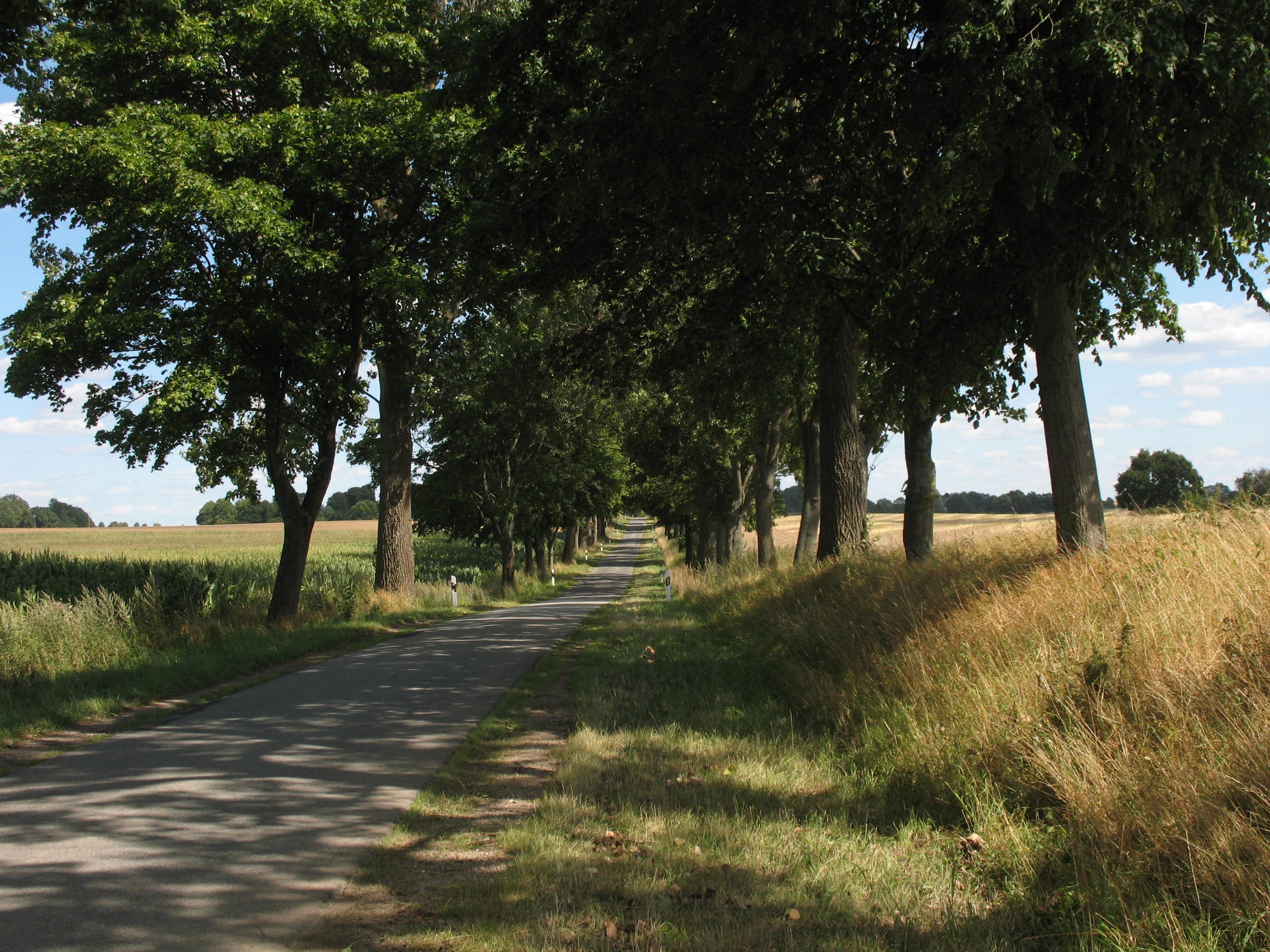

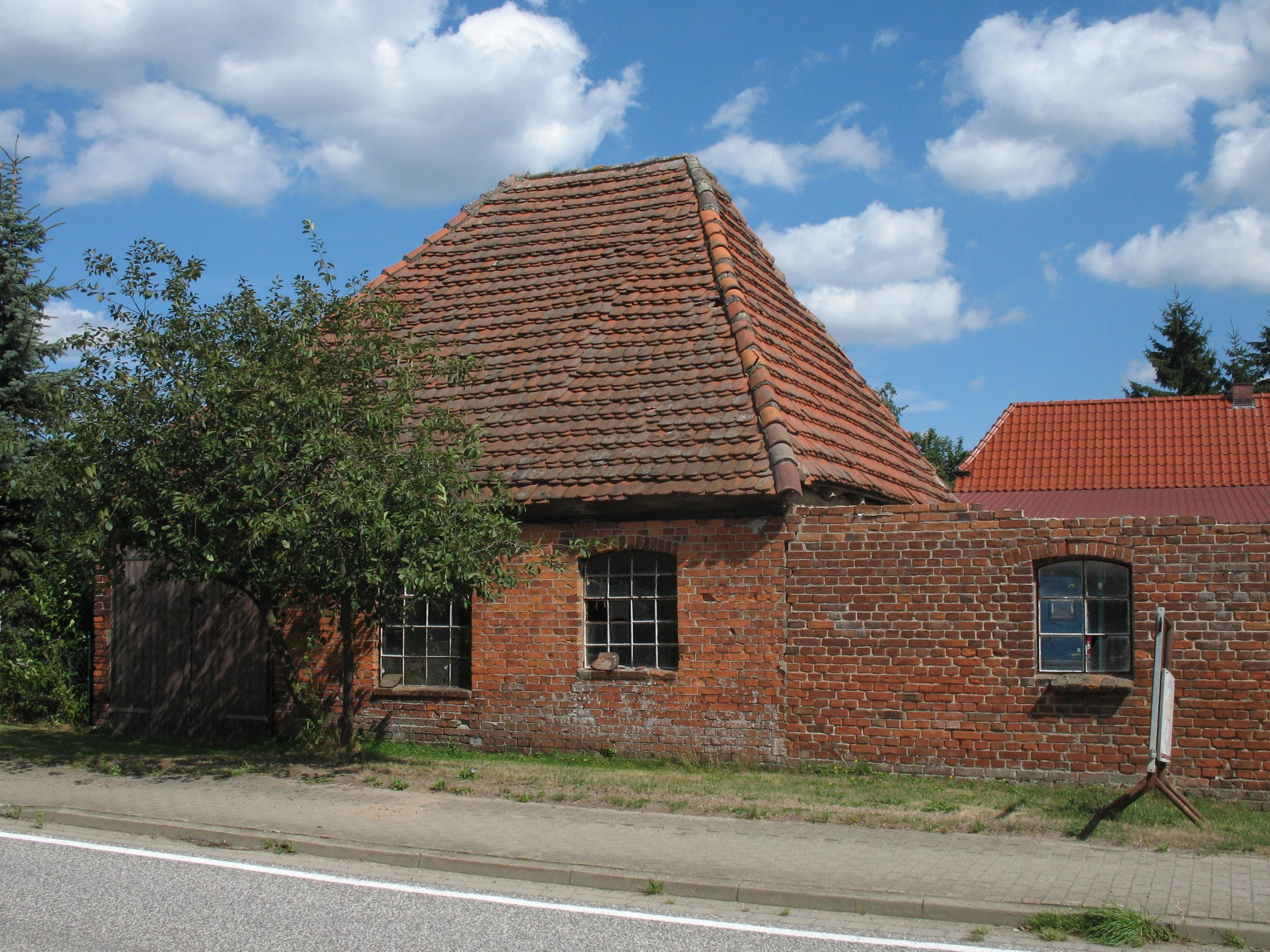
Former forge in Ruester Krug

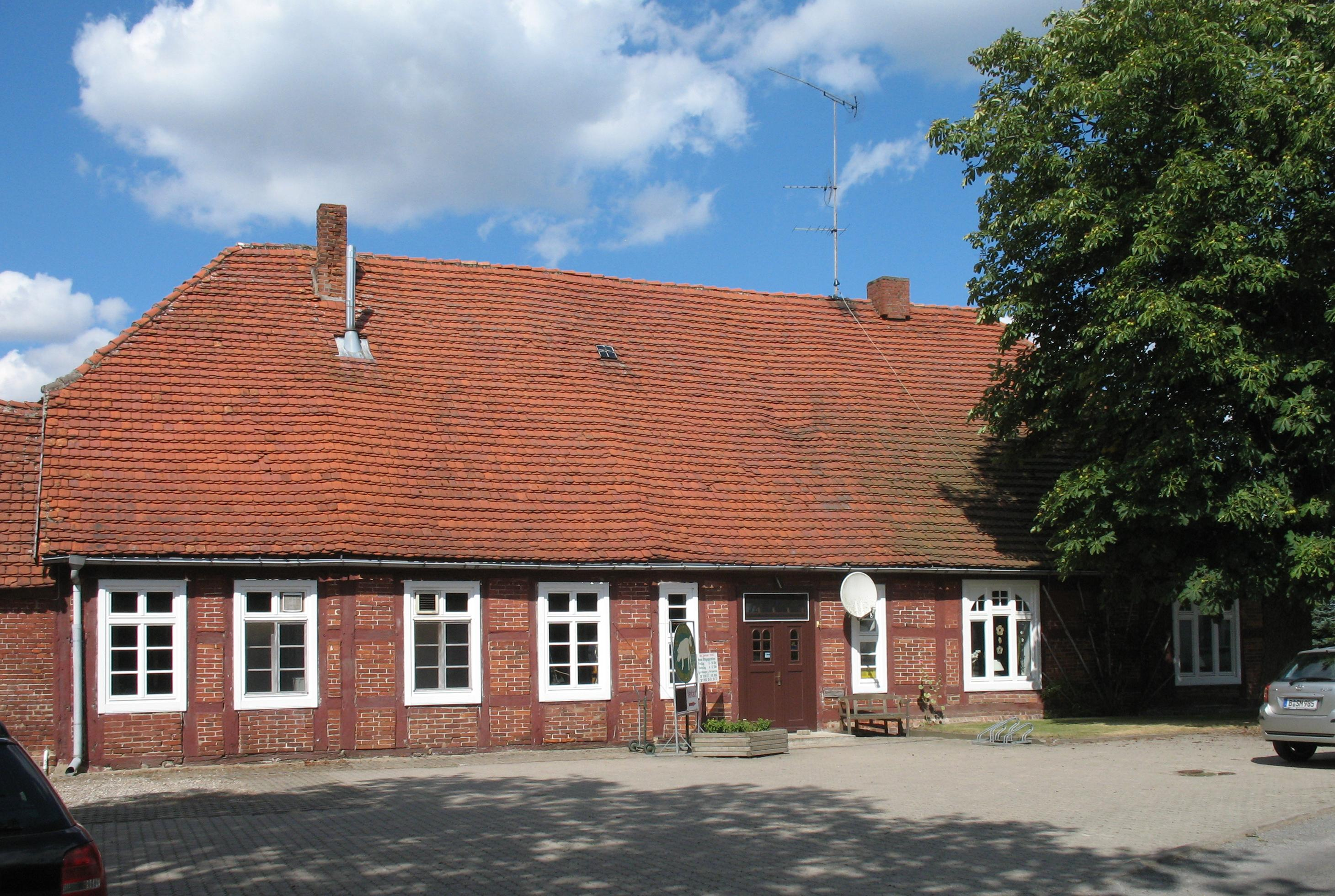
Ruest-Krug 4
