= Neu Poserin =

- Municipality
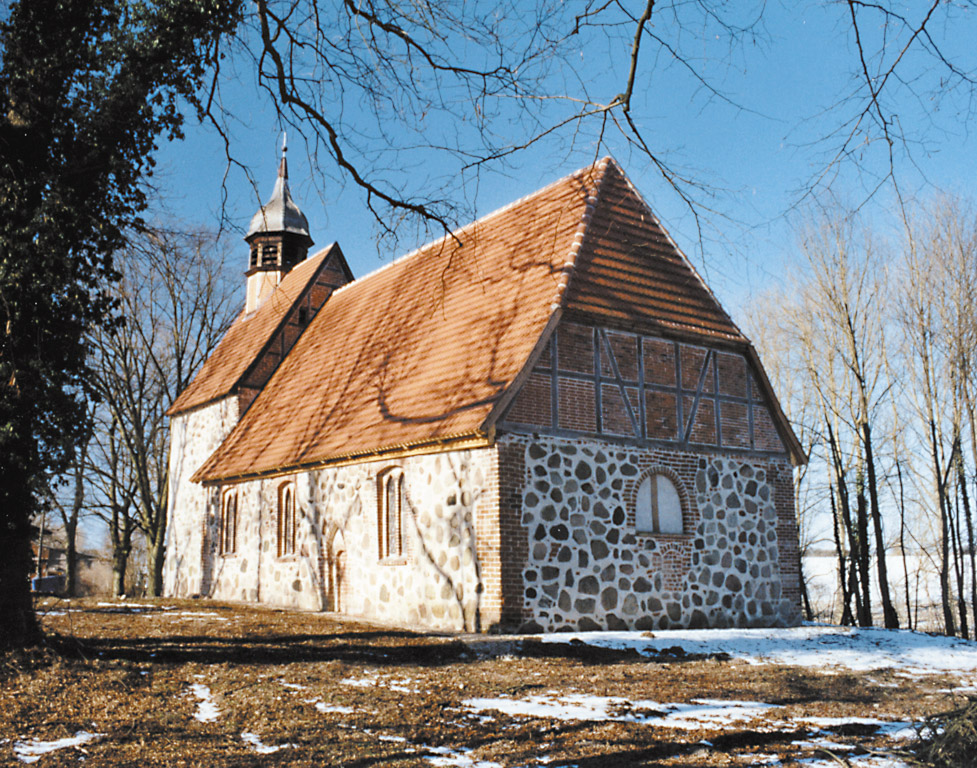
- Church

- Location of Neu Poserin within Ludwigslust-Parchim district
- Interactive map of Neu Poserin
- Location within Germany Location within Mecklenburg-Vorpommern
- Coordinates: 53°33′N 12°10′E
- Country: Germany
- State: Mecklenburg-Vorpommern
- District: Ludwigslust-Parchim
- Municipal assoc.: Goldberg-Mildenitz
- Subdivisions: 9

Government
  - Mayor: Bettina Zwerschke

Area
  - Total: 47.34 km^{2} (18.28 sq mi)
- Elevation: 55 m (180 ft)

Population (2025-12-31)
  - Total: 507
  - Density: 10.7/km^{2} (27.7/sq mi)
- Time zone: UTC+01:00 (CET)
  - Summer (DST): UTC+02:00 (CEST)
- Postal codes: 19399
- Dialling codes: 038736
- Vehicle registration: PCH
- Website: www.neu-poserin.de

Neu Poserin is a municipality in the Ludwigslust-Parchim district, in Mecklenburg-Vorpommern, Germany.
