= Goldberg-Mildenitz =

- Amt
- Map of Ludwigslust-Parchim highlighting Goldberg-Mildenitz
- Interactive map of Goldberg-Mildenitz
- Location within Germany Location within Mecklenburg-Vorpommern
- Coordinates: 53°34′N 12°04′E
- Country: Germany
- State: Mecklenburg-Vorpommern
- District: Ludwigslust-Parchim
- Seat: Goldberg
- Subdivisions: 5 municipalities

Area
  - Total: 245.87 km^{2} (94.93 sq mi)

Population (2025-12-31)
  - Total: 6,112
  - Density: 24.86/km^{2} (64.38/sq mi)
- Time zone: UTC+01:00 (CET)
  - Summer (DST): UTC+02:00 (CEST)
- Website: www.amt-goldberg-mildenitz.de

Goldberg-Mildenitz is an Amt in the Ludwigslust-Parchim district, in Mecklenburg-Vorpommern, Germany. The seat of the Amt is in Goldberg.

The Amt Goldberg-Mildenitz consists of the following municipalities:

1. Dobbertin
2. Goldberg
3. Mestlin
4. Neu Poserin
5. Techentin
