= Dobbertiner See =

Lake in Mecklenburg-Vorpommern, Germany

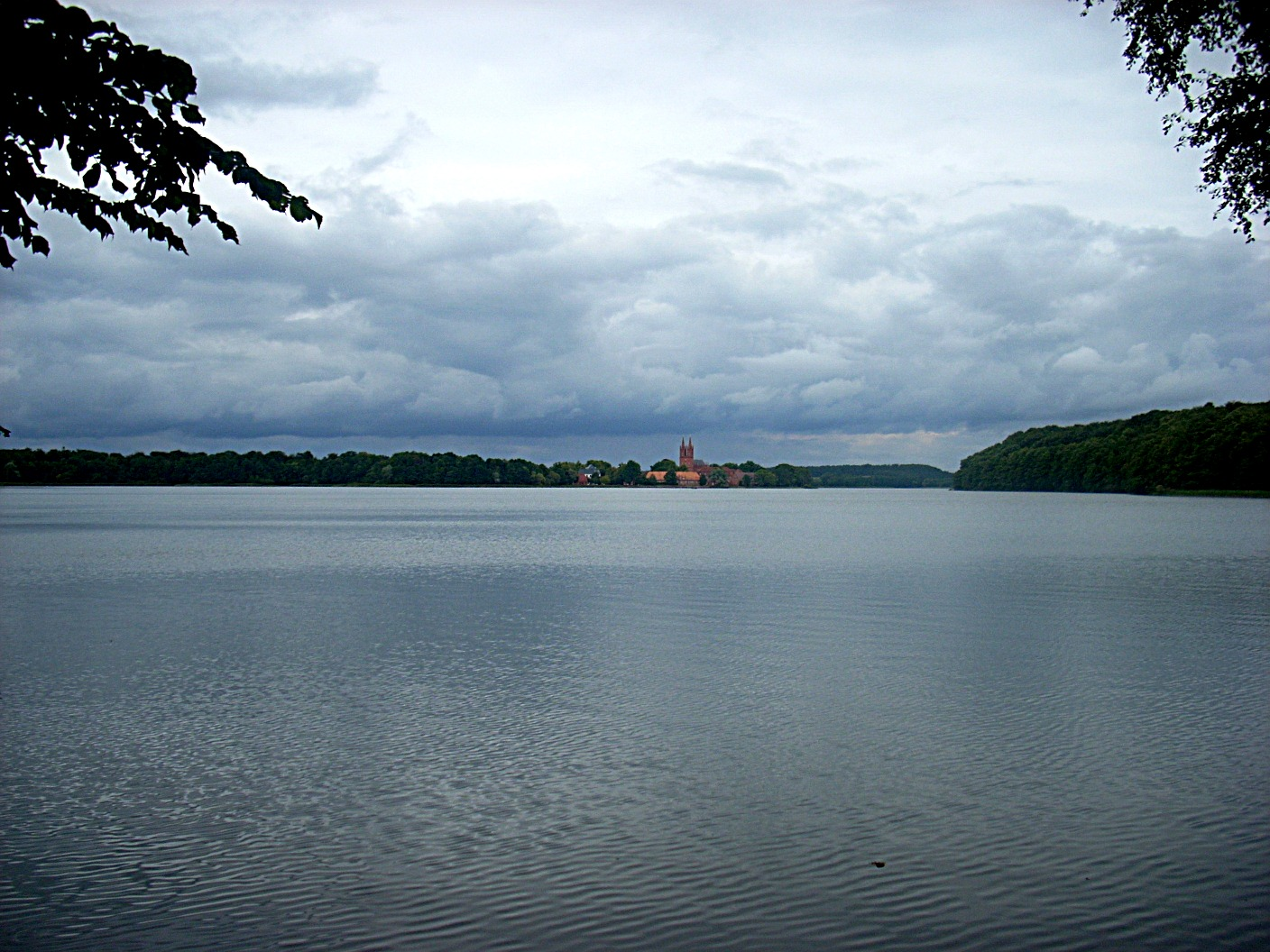

- Location within Mecklenburg-Vorpommern
- Location: Dobbertin, Mecklenburg-Vorpommern
- Coordinates: 53.613889°N 12.068889°E
- Primary inflows: Mildenitz
- Primary outflows: Mildenitz
- Basin countries: Germany
- Max. length: 2.78 km (1.73 mi)
- Max. width: 0.851 km (0.529 mi)
- Surface area: 3.64 km^{2} (1.41 sq mi)
- Average depth: 4.8 m (16 ft)
- Max. depth: 11.8 m (39 ft)
- Surface elevation: 45 m (148 ft)
- Islands: none

The Dobbertiner See is a lake within the Sternberger Seenlandschaft in Mecklenburg-Vorpommern, Germany. It is situated immediately to the south of the municipality of Dobbertin, and is about 200 kilometres (120 mi) northwest of Berlin.

The lake is approximately 2.78 kilometres (1.73 mi) long and 0.851 kilometres (0.529 mi) wide, with an average depth of 4.8 metres (16 ft) and a maximum depth of 11.8 metres (39 ft). It has an area of 3.36 square kilometres (1.30 sq mi), and is only 45.0 metres (147.6 ft) above sea level.
