= Techentin =

- Municipality
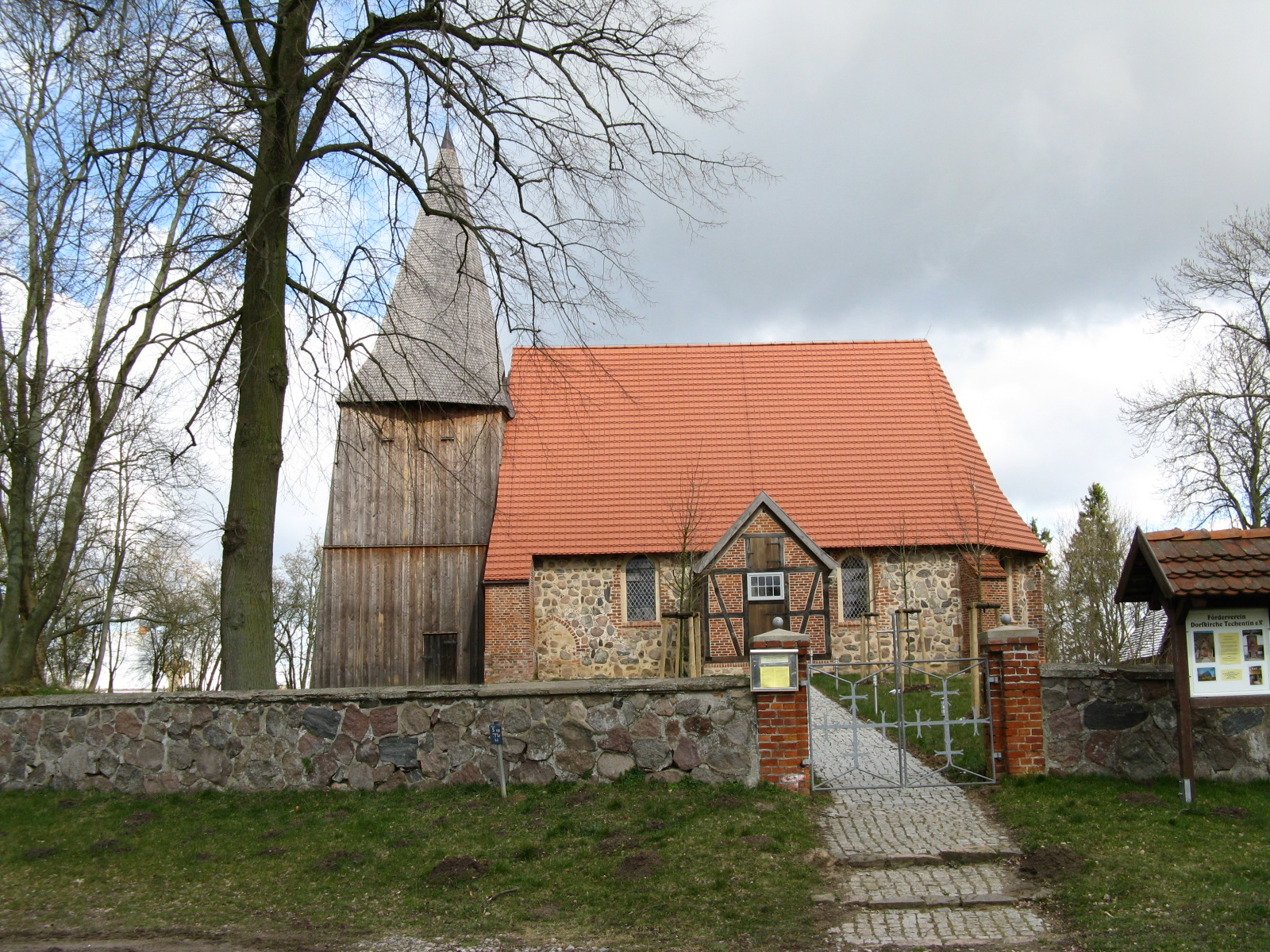
- Church

- Coat of arms

- Location of Techentin within Ludwigslust-Parchim district
- Interactive map of Techentin
- Location within Germany Location within Mecklenburg-Vorpommern
- Coordinates: 53°35′N 11°59′E
- Country: Germany
- State: Mecklenburg-Vorpommern
- District: Ludwigslust-Parchim
- Municipal assoc.: Goldberg-Mildenitz
- Subdivisions: 5

Government
  - Mayor: Hans Helmut Gertz

Area
  - Total: 41.42 km^{2} (15.99 sq mi)
- Elevation: 63 m (207 ft)

Population (2025-12-31)
  - Total: 646
  - Density: 15.6/km^{2} (40.4/sq mi)
- Time zone: UTC+01:00 (CET)
  - Summer (DST): UTC+02:00 (CEST)
- Postal codes: 19399
- Dialling codes: 038736
- Vehicle registration: PCH
- Website: www.gemeinde-techentin.de

Techentin is a municipality in the Ludwigslust-Parchim district, in Mecklenburg-Vorpommern, Germany.
